Cooper's hawk (Accipiter cooperii) is a medium-sized hawk native to the North American continent and found from southern Canada to Mexico. This species is a member of the genus Accipiter, sometimes referred to as true hawks, which are famously agile, relatively small hawks common to wooded habitats around the world and also the most diverse of all diurnal raptor genera. As in many birds of prey, the male is smaller than the female. The birds found east of the Mississippi River tend to be larger on average than the birds found to the west. It is easily confused with the smaller but similar sharp-shinned hawk. (A. striatus)

The species was named in 1828 by Charles Lucien Bonaparte in honor of his friend and fellow ornithologist, William Cooper. Other common names for the Cooper's hawk include: big blue darter, chicken hawk, flying cross, hen hawk, quail hawk, striker, and swift hawk. Many of the names applied to the Cooper's hawks refer to their ability to hunt large and evasive prey using extremely well-developed agility. This species primarily hunts small-to-medium-sized birds, but will also commonly take small mammals and sometimes reptiles.

Like most related hawks, Cooper's hawks prefer to nest in tall trees with extensive canopy cover and can commonly produce up to two to four fledglings depending on conditions. Breeding attempts may be compromised by poor weather, predators and anthropogenic causes, in particular the use of industrial pesticides and other chemical pollution in the 20th century. Despite declines due to manmade causes, the bird remains a stable species.

Taxonomy

Cooper's hawk was formally described by the French naturalist Charles Lucien Bonaparte in 1828 from a specimen collected near Bordentown, New Jersey. He coined the binomial name Falco cooperii. The specific epithet and the common name were chosen to honour the naturalist William Cooper, one of the founders of the New York Lyceum of Natural History (later the New York Academy of Sciences) in New York City. Other common names have been known to include the big blue darter, chicken hawk, hen hawk, Mexican hawk, quail hawk, striker and swift hawk. The Cooper's hawk is a member of the genus Accipiter, sometimes referred to as "true hawks" (and the members of which are at times commonly referred to as goshawks or sparrowhawks). This genus is the most diverse of all in the species-rich family Accipitridae, with nearly 50 recognized species, and is also the most diverse of all diurnal raptor genera. The genus Accipiter appeared to diversify in the last few million years due to an increase in accessible avian prey. They appear to be a sister genera to Circus or harriers, albeit a distantly related one. Other smaller genera including Harpagus and Erythrotriorchis also appear to bear some relation. Genetic studies of three Asian Accipiter species showed that they may not be a monophyletic group, with various clades divisions outside traditional subfamily lines, with even the sharp-shinned hawk-like and aptly named tiny hawk (Accipiter supercilious) appearing to cluster outside of the genus nearer very dissimilar genera like Buteo and Milvus. It appears that the Cooper's hawk was the earliest Accipiter to colonize North America with a well-defined fossil record dating back perhaps 0.5-1 million years. Fossil evidence shows then that the goshawk came second and, despite the considerably wider range of the sharp-shinned hawk compared to the other two species, the ancestors of the sharp-shinned hawk came over the Bering Land Bridge last. Genetic testing has indicated that the Cooper's hawk is quite closely related to the northern goshawk, with the similar superficial characteristics of the Cooper's to the sharp-shinned hawk, a close relative of the Old World sparrowhawk, apparently obtained through convergent evolution. A natural hybrid of a Cooper's hawk and a northern goshawk with intermediate physical characteristics was verified via genetic testing of a migrant juvenile in Cape May and was thought to indicate a northward expansion of the Cooper's range into historic goshawk haunts.

No subspecies are recognized of the Cooper's hawk. A previously described subspecies, A. c. mexicanus, was discounted due to being weakly differentiated. However, evidence based on genetic markers shows that westerly birds such those in British Columbia populations are genetically differentiated from those in the Upper Midwest, indicating that the Cooper's hawk were restricted to at least two Pleistocene glacial refugia with the Rocky mountains acting as a natural barrier to gene flow between hawks on either side while breeding. Several of the other similar largish Accipiter species in the Americas appear to be closely related, possibly within a species complex, to the Cooper's hawk, namely the bicolored hawk, widespread through Central and South America, and the Chilean hawk (Accipiter chilensis). While there is some degree of obvious differentiation from these species in appearance, distribution and behavior, more nebulous is the Cooper's hawk relationship to the very similar Gundlach's hawk of Cuba. In general the relationship of the Cooper's and Gundlach's hawk is muddled and genetic testing indicated that it is possible (but not certain) that the Gundlach's may be insufficiently distinct to qualify as a separate species. It is almost certain that the Cooper's hawk would at least qualify as the paraspecies for the Gundlach's and data has indicated fairly recent colonization and hybridization between the two hawks.

Description 

Cooper's hawk is a medium-sized hawk and relatively large for an Accipiter. Compared to related species, they tend to have moderate-length wings, a long, often graduated or even wedge-shaped tail and long though moderately thick legs and toes. Their eyes tend to be set well forward in the sides of the relatively large and squarish-looking head (though the head can look somewhat rounded if the feathers on the nape are held flush) and a relatively short but robust bill. They have hooked bills that are well-adapted for tearing the flesh of prey, as is typical of raptorial birds. Generally, Cooper's hawks can be considered secretive, often perching within the canopy, but can use more open perches, especially in the western part of the range or in winter when they may use leafless or isolated trees, utility poles or exposed stumps. On perched hawks, the wing-tips tend to appear to cover less than one third of the tail, sometimes seeming to barely cover the covert feathers. As adults, they may be a solid blue-gray or brown-gray color above. Adults usually have a well-defined crown of blackish-brown feathers above a paler nape and hindneck offset against their streaked rufous cheeks. Their tail is blue-gray on top and pale underneath, barred with three black bands in a rather even pattern and ending in a rather conspicuous white tip. The adult's underside shows a bit of whitish base color overlaid heavily with coarse, irregular rufous to cinnamon bands, though these narrow into marginal shaft streaks around the throat. Against the rich color on the rest of the underside, the pure white  on adults is conspicuous. Adult females may average slightly more brownish or grayish above, while some adult males can range rarely into almost a powder blue color. Although little regional variation is known in the plumage, adult coloring in the Pacific Northwest averages slightly darker overall. Aberrant pale plumage was recorded in at least four total birds of both sexes, all of which were almost completely white and lacked any underside streaking. These birds had faded back color and lacking strong barring on the tail. An aberrant dark female was also recorded. As a juvenile, she had a blackish-brown (rather than mid-brown) back and dark inky feathers below with grayish ground color barely showing. Later she produced an aberrant male with similar characteristics that successfully fledged. The latter two were possible cases of melanism and such dark variations are virtually unprecedented in any Accipiter species.

Juveniles of the species are generally dark brown above, though the feathers are not infrequently edged with rufous to cinnamon and have a variable whitish mottling about the back, wing coverts and, mainly, the scapulars. Juvenile Cooper's tend to have streaking or washing of tawny on the cheeks, ending in a light nuchal strip, giving them a hooded appearance unlike the capped appearance of adults (some juveniles, unlike adults, may manifest a slim supercilium as well). The crown is brown on juveniles rather than blackish as in adults. The tail is similar to that of the adult but more brownish and sometimes shows an additional fourth band. The juvenile has more pale white to cream base color showing than older birds, with variable dusky throat striping and mid-brown streaks, which appear as sharply defined from about the lower throat to the lower breast. The juvenile may have brown to black spots or bars on the thighs with thin black streaks mostly ending at the belly and conspicuous white crissum and undertail coverts. Juveniles can tend to appear more "disheveled" and less compact than adults in feather composition. In flight, though usually considered medium-sized, Cooper's hawks can appear fairly small. This effect is emphasized by the short wings relative to the elongated tail (unlike unrelated hawks, the wingspan is usually less than twice as broad as the total length). The species tends to have rounded wings, a long rounded tail and long legs, much like other Accipiters. Cooper's hawks have a strong flight with stiff beats and short glides, tending to do so on quite level wings with wrist thrust forward yet the head consistently projects. The 5 outer functional primaries are notched on their inner webs, the outermost is the longest, the next outermost nearly as long. When soaring, these hawks do so on flattish or, more commonly, slightly raised wings, with fairly straight leading edges. Against the barred underbody on adults, the wings are more or less flecked in similar color, with pale greyish flight feathers and a broadly white-tipped tail correspondingly barred with dark gray. Meanwhile, the upperside of adults is essentially all blue-grey. Juvenile are mostly dark above though manifest a hooded effect on the head and a rufous-buff edges and especially whitish mottling, the latter can be fairly apparent. Juveniles are mainly whitish below with neatly dark streaks about the wing linings, breast, flanks and thighs, with bars on the axillaries and flight feathers. The tail of the juvenile has a broadly white tip and bars like adults but the ground color is a paler shade of gray.

Adults have eyes ranging from light orange to red, with males averaging darker in eye color, while those of juveniles are yellow. Among 370 breeding hawks from different parts of the range, 1-year-old males usually had light orange eyes and 1-year-old females usually yellow eyes. Meanwhile, males of 2 or more years old always had consistently darker eyes than the eyes of females of the same relative age, with most males of the age having largely either orange (40.4%) or dark orange (32.3%) eyes, while female eyes at this stage were light orange or lighter. From the second year, the eyes of Cooper's hawks may grow darker still but stop darkening shortly thereafter. 3-year or older males were found to have predominantly dark orange (37.3% vs 21.6% of similar age females), red (34.6% vs 3.3% of similar age females) or mid-orange (26.6% vs 55% of similar age females). For unclear reasons, far more adults in British Columbia and North Dakota (83% of males, 63% of females) had dark orange or red eyes (which also manifested at an earlier age in British Columbia) than mature hawks in Wisconsin (49% of males, 14% of females). Most females over 2 years old in Wisconsin were found to have light orange eyes. The purpose of bright eye color in the hawks may be correlated to feeding stimulation of nestling hawks (i.e. darker orange or red objects may be more perceptible and tend to be pecked at more so than duller colors). The eyes of this hawk, as in most predatory birds, face forward, enabling good depth perception for hunting and catching prey while flying at top speeds. Adults have greenish yellow ceres and have legs of orangish to yellow while these parts on juveniles are a paler hue, yellow-green to yellow. The prebasic molt begins in late April–May and takes about 4 months. The female usually begins to molt about 7–10 days sooner than the male. Molts occur inward towards the body on the wing feathers. Tail molt may generally start with the middle tail feathers, proceeding posteriorly to the upper tail coverts, also starting with the median feathers on the scapulars. Up to 36% of juvenile feathers may be retained in the second pre-basic molt. Arrested molt has been recorded in the late nesting period, often pausing after the third primary is molted. Molts tend to be halted especially when food supplies are down during the brooding stage, and may be resumed after the stress of feeding the brooding diminishes.

Size
Cooper's hawks are fairly variable in size. There is usually minimal to no overlap in dimensions between the sexes, with females being considerably larger than males. On average, she may be about 20% larger linearly and around 40% heavier (though can be up to 125% more massive). More westerly Cooper's hawks (roughly west of the Rocky mountains) show slightly less pronounced sexual dimorphism than hawks of the species elsewhere. Sexual dimorphism in Cooper's hawks is most reliably measured by wing size, talon size, then body mass. Although there is some margin of error, within a given region dimensions of the two sexes never overlap in these regards (but may overlap marginally in tarsal and tail lengths). In general terms, Accipiter species are among the most sexually dimorphic in size of all raptorial birds. Sexual dimorphism in Accipiters may be due to greater male efficiency through smaller size and resulting agility in food gathering for the family group. Meanwhile, the female may be better suited to the rigors of brooding (including perhaps most nest defense) due to her larger size, also allowing the sexes to compete less on the same food sources. Geographic variation in body size has also been found, with more easterly hawks tending to be rather larger on average than those found in western North America. On the contrary, in the American southwest, the species may reportedly reach its largest sizes but there is little evidence that these birds average distinctly larger than the large bodied individuals measured in the more northeasterly parts of the species’ range in North America, from eastern North Dakota to New Jersey. The size variation evidenced in Cooper's hawks is apparently the most pronounced of any of the three North American species of Accipiter. However, Cooper's hawks are one of an estimated 25% of studied bird species that do not appear to correspond to Bergmann's rule (i.e. being larger where living farther north) instead varying in size much more so by longitude. Furthermore, juveniles can differ somewhat in size, tending to be slightly lighter and smaller than older birds, but not infrequently averaging longer in tail and especially wing length.
 

Body mass, along with standard measurements, is much more frequently measured than total length or wingspan in different populations. Weights were similar to the Goshutes in the Marin Headlands, California where 50 males (all first-years) averaged  and 117 first-year females averaged . The average weights of Cooper's hawks from Oregon was about 19.4% lower in males and 14.5% lower in females than those from Wisconsin but the Oregon hawks evidenced less seasonal variation in weight. In British Columbia, males averaged  and females averaged  while in western and eastern North Dakota, males averaged  and females averaged . In northern Florida, males averaged  and females averaged .

Wing chord is generally commensurate with body mass, averaging largest in the heavier hawks of eastern North Dakota, where males averaged  and females , and in Wisconsin, where males averaged  and females  (those from Cape May also being similar to those two samples). The footpad of Cooper's hawks may measure in males , averaging  in 42, and in females , averaging  in 23.

Voice

Some authors have claimed that during breeding Cooper's hawks may utter well over 40 call variations, which would rank them as having among the most varied collection of calls recorded for any raptor. However, many such variations are probably quite subtle (marginal differences in harshness, clarity, tempo and volume) and other authors have diagnosed only four overall call types. The typical call of a Cooper's hawk is a harsh, cackling yelp. This call may be translated as keh-keh-keh..., males tending to have a higher pitched, less raspy and faster-paced voice than females. However, some variants uttered by males were surprisingly actually deeper than the female's version of said calls. A still more modulated and raucous version is given during the dawn chorus. Some studies have indicated that pairs nesting in more deeply wooded areas may vocalize more frequently due to inferior sight lines. However, hawks nesting in urban areas of Arizona do not seem to vocalize less than their rural nesting counterparts. There is perhaps some evidence that individual hawk's voices may become lower pitched with age. When coming with food to the nest or while displaying during courtship, the male may let out a nighthawk-like kik, apparently this call is more prevalent in pairs using thicker woods. Infrequently, females may utter the kik call as well, apparently when looking for her mate or gathering nesting materials. Many soft calls have been recorded in intimate or "conversational" interactions, exclusively between breeding pairs and between mothers and their broods. The initial call of the young is a cheep or chirrp, which by the time they are fledgling young alters to a penetrating hunger call, eeeeeeee-oo or tseeeee-ar (among different transliterations). The higher pitched calls of the young may even extend to females nesting within their first year while still in immature plumage. Females have what is often thought of as their own hunger cry, whaaaa, heard especially in poorer food areas, when the male appears. Nonetheless, the females whaaaa call has also been uttered in different contexts, such as during nest building and during a "postural bowing" display, and some authors inferred that it may be a means of communicating to the male that it is not dangerous for him to approach her (as female Accipiters can be dangerous to the much smaller males). Generally, Cooper's hawks are silent outside the breeding season. Rarely, though, some males that appear to be isolated from any other hawks of their species have been known to call during winter.

Confusion species

Accipiter species in North America are arguably the most vexing raptor to identify in the continent. The other two species in North America are the smaller sharp-shinned hawk (Accipiter striatus) and the larger northern goshawk (Accipiter gentilis). Compared to the other two Accipiters, Cooper's have an intermediate amount of feathering at top of the tarsus, as well as intermediate relative middle toe length and eye proportions, but have relatively the longest tail and the shortest wings of the three. The Cooper's and sharp-shinned hawk are very similar (sometimes considered almost identical) in plumage characteristics at all stages of development. Most Cooper's hawks are considerably larger than most sharp-shinned hawks. Generally, the Cooper's species is crow-sized, with the males about the size of a small crow and the females the size of a large crow, while most sharp-shinned hawks are about the size of a large jay. Also in the hand, Cooper's hawks and sharp-shinned hawks may be fairly reliably distinguished by their sizes, with the smallest male Cooper's always being heavier and larger clawed than the largest female sharp-shinned hawk (with a 97–98% difference in dimensions of the wing and tail). However, in the field, especially when hawks must be identified in at a distance or at unfavorable angles (such as when migrating) or at a brief glance (such as when hunting), even experienced birdwatchers may not always be able to certainly distinguish the two species, especially female sharp-shins against the nearly similarly sized male Cooper's. The sharp-shinned hawk usually evidences a slimmer, slighter look, with more dainty features, and has relatively longer wings and a shorter and more squared tail with a much thinner white tip. Other slight difference may be noted in plumage via the sharp-shins lacking the capped appearance of adult Cooper's (being more hooded) and being generally slightly darker above. Juvenile sharp-shins, upon relatively leisurely study, can be seen to differ from juvenile Cooper's by having clearer supercilia, browner cheeks and less extensive whitish mottling above and also coarser streaking below extending more to belly. Bare parts, mostly distinguishable as well at close range, differ by the more centered and clearly relatively larger eyes and notably stick-like legs of the sharp-shins. However, often these features can often be difficult to impossible to discern when the hawks are seen in the wild. More distinctive in the field is the larger, more protruding head of the flying Cooper's hawks rather than the compact, rounded head of the sharp-shins which barely appear to exceed the leading edge of the wings in flight. Sometimes Cooper's is considered to look like a "flying cross" in comparison to the sharp-shins. Accipiter hawks of all species are seen mostly flying with quick, consecutive wing beats and a short glide (sometimes abbreviated as “flap-flap-glide”), though the species may also soar as well. However, the sharp-shinned hawk has a more buoyant flight with faster wing beats than the Cooper's and soars with flatter wings (although again variations in the field make these characteristics far from foolproof).
 
As for the northern goshawk, the smallest male is still usually "clearly" larger than most large female Cooper's hawks. In the Goshutes mountains, migrant male goshawks overlapped with female Cooper's hawks only in the length of the tail and the tarsus, with the body mass especially being quite distinct. In Oregon, male goshawks averaged no less than 34% more massive than female Cooper's hawks, however the footpad of the Cooper's females was almost the same size (7% larger on average in the latter) as the male goshawks (these may be features adapted to procuring birds as prey more so as bird-hunting raptors tend to have more elongated foot morphology). Proportionately, goshawks have longer, broader wings, shorter tail and a generally more Buteo-like form overall. Adult goshawks also have broad supercilia, pale gray color on the underside and a much darker coloring on the back. Given reasonable views, adult goshawks are very different looking and hard to mistake for any Cooper's hawk. Meanwhile, the juvenile goshawk is much paler edged above than the smaller Cooper's, including a panel formed along larger wing coverts. Below, juvenile goshawks have heavier streaks of a darker brown color than juvenile Cooper's. Also, the banding on the tail is off-set on goshawks, creating a zigzag effect on the tail, unlike the even barring on the juvenile Cooper's. Again, though, female Cooper's and male goshawks can come close to the same size and the not dissimilar juvenile plumage of the two species can lead to regular misidentification, especially to those with less prior experience viewing the more scarce goshawk. The most reliable way to distinguish a large juvenile Accipiter in the field are the differing proportions of the two species, followed by the heavier streaking below and irregular tail banding of the goshawk. For the Cooper's hawk, there may be a possible and marginal overlap with the bicolored hawk (Accipiter bicolor) in southern Mexico and Central America. The latter species of similar form and size but at all ages is generally unmarked with bars or streaks below, also with a more or less uniform mantle. Vagrating migrant Cooper's hawks to Cuba may very rarely occur alongside another close relative, Gundlach's hawk (Accipiter gundlachi), which is quite similar in most aspects to Cooper's but is slightly larger with a darker hue about the back and the cap, a gray cheek, more dense and rich rufous color on the underside and wing panel in adults and darker and more heavy streaking in juvenile form. More unlikely to be mistaken for a Cooper's hawk are some buteonine hawks such as gray hawks (Buteo plagiatus), roadside hawks (Rupornis magnirostris) (in Mexico and points south) and broad-winged hawks (Buteo platypterus) which are all similar in size to the Cooper's as well as the slightly larger red-shouldered hawk (Buteo lineatus). Even the most similar buteonine hawks have notably different proportions than a Cooper's hawk, possessing relatively much longer wings and a much shorter tail. Given reasonable views, all such species are fairly to extremely different in plumage even in juvenile form.

Distribution and habitat

The Cooper's hawk's breeding range extends from southern Canada to northern Mexico. In southern Canada, they breed (but do not normally winter) in the southerly parts of the provinces of British Columbia, Alberta, Saskatchewan, Manitoba, Ontario, Quebec to extreme southwestern Nova Scotia. They reach their northerly limits as a breeder roughly in Jasper National Park and Cedar Lake, Manitoba. Cooper's hawks live almost throughout the contiguous United States, excepting some parts of the southern Great Plains, as well as perhaps a bit of northwestern Maine and northernmost Montana. Their breeding range terminates just before the southern part of Gulf Coast states, south Florida, the southern tip of Texas and all but inland northwestern Mexico. Their Mexican breeding range consists of northern Baja California, the mountains from eastern Sonora and Chihuahua to Durango, also recently in northern Coahuila, formerly east into Nuevo Leon and south to Michoacán and possibly still in Guerrero. In Oaxaca, records show that the species has been recorded year-around with the first confirmed breeding reported in 2001. In winter, they are found up to the southern half of Washington, the southern two-thirds of Idaho and Wyoming, southern South Dakota, the southern parts of Minnesota, Wisconsin and Michigan, extreme southwestern Ontario, southwestern and southeastern New York and New England up through all but northwestern Massachusetts and to the southeastern part of New Hampshire. In winter they range regularly throughout the parts of the southern United States where they do not breed, such as all Gulf Coast areas and in south Florida. Wintering Cooper's hawks are common through essentially all parts of Mexico, becoming less regular around Guatemala and isolated spots of the border of Honduras and Nicaragua, where the species is considered "infrequent but regular" as well as in central and southern Costa Rica and perhaps northern Panama. Vagrants have been recorded in Colombia. There are several cumulative records of Cooper's hawks also appearing in Cuba at times of migration but generally the species is still considered a vagrant rather than a regularly occurring species there.

Habitat
The Cooper's hawk tend to occur in various types of temperate deciduous forest and mixed forest. They are also adaptable in all seasons to forested mountainous regions, especially foothills. The species may further make itself at home in some pure conifer forest, including the extreme southern part of the taiga but also in many parts of the west. The species can habituate favorably while breeding to various kinds of open woodlands, including small woodlots, riparian woodlands in dry country, pinyon woodlands, farmlands and floodplains. In fact, some authors felt the species increased locally in wooded parts of the Rocky mountains after human habitat fragmentation of once continuous woodland areas. Adaptability to forest fragmentation has also been reported in other parts of the range.

In denser forest areas, these hawks tend to prefer easy access to edges, clearings, roads and waterways. However, in the Appalachians, there seemed to no detectable preference for access to water. Forest edges, in particular, tend to be key as these are peak hunting grounds for these hawks. In the American southwest and northwestern Mexico, they are commonly considered a bird of wooded foothills, often dwelling above . Although they often live in areas where deciduous trees are predominant, almost throughout the range they are often attracted to stands of conifers, which, due to their density, provide more extensive shelter and perhaps a more sturdy nesting site. Therefore, in areas such as Massachusetts and Wisconsin, they most often used stands of white pines (Pinus strobus). Additional Wisconsin studies showed that exotic conifer stands now support many Cooper's hawks even where native woodland is available. Tall, native deciduous tree stands may still be used extensively elsewhere, i.e. American beeches (Fagus grandifolia) in New York (nearly 40% of nest trees used) and oaks in Maryland (60% of trees used as nests). This species often prefers fairly mature forest, i.e. in two different areas of Oregon, the Cooper's hawks preferred areas with trees of 30–60 years old (and 656 trees per ha) and 50–70 years old (and 1159 trees per ha), respectively. On average, the number of trees per hectare in Arkansas were found to be 935.7. Canopy coverage is key to nesting Cooper's hawks, needing to be at minimum about 55–70%, averaging 55% in Wisconsin and 69.8% in Arizona.

More so than breeding habitat, wintering habitat seems to be highly opportunistic. They may be found in any environment with some trees, including open woods, parkland and scrub areas. In Central America, wintering Cooper's hawks have been recorded in unusual habitats such as stunted cloud forest and treeless montane grassland. In most parts of the range, Cooper's hawks have shown to be somewhat adaptive to all gradients of human development, including urbanized areas and can even nests in many cities. They were once thought to be averse to cities and towns, but are now fairly common urban and suburban birds even when nesting. The species may even making use of isolated trees in suburbs, industrial parks and strip and shopping malls though large urban parks and other available wooded habitat is usually preferred in such areas when nesting. The cities provide plenty of prey species such as pigeons and doves and invasive species of bird for the Cooper's hawk to prey on. Evidence from a well-studied population in the city of Tucson, Arizona shows that Cooper's hawks are now considerably more common within the city than elsewhere in the surrounding regions. Despite the success of Cooper's hawks in Tucson, attempts to find breeding activity in Phoenix and Casa Grande were unsuccessful, it is thought that the ambient temperature was too high or beyond thermal tolerance levels. Although more adaptable in habitat than the sharp-shinned hawk, studies from Pennsylvania have indicated that the species still more often than not prefers sizeable tracts of woodland for breeding and migrating to fragmented, developed areas. Similarly, in Tennessee, it was found for wintering Cooper's hawks that forested areas were 73% of the habitats used, which is far more prevalent than woodland available in the environs (with only 46% remaining wooded).

Behavior

The Cooper's hawk is a typical Accipiter in all respects. This species tends to be active earlier in the morning than sharp-shinned hawks and Eurasian sparrowhawks (Accipiter nisus) and is generally much more likely to be active in the morning than in the afternoon. These hawks may readily take to conifers to roost, generally sleeping with their heads tucked in. During daylight hours, they tend to preen while sitting on a perch about 11 times a day, and may take about 1–20 minutes to do so. When attaining water to drink, Cooper's hawks appear to prefer to come to relatively secluded waterways. In more arid regions, Cooper's hawks may seek out artificial bodies of water to drink from (especially in passage). Although a rare behavior, there are now several records of juvenile hawks of the species proning wherein they lie on their backs along a branch (or rarely the ground), apparently as a form of sunning. Cooper's hawks may come to walk on ground to gather nesting materials as well as to hunt. Cooper's hawks have a well-developed muscle mass that powers their flight, especially helping with acceleration during hunts and when carrying heavy prey. However, some other non-raptorial birds may have similar muscularity relative to their mass, such as the Canada goose (Branta canadensis) and even pied-billed grebes (Podilymbus podiceps), and these ample muscle masses may be correlated with migratory (rather than hunting) behavior. Cooper's hawks have been recorded as engaging in an exaggerated, nighthawk-like flight in non-courtship circumstances, such as during migration or by recent fledglings. During the late nesting stage, parent Cooper's hawks were recorded during daylight in Utah to engage in soaring flight 8.4% for males and 8.1% of the time for females with a further 6.4% and 2.8% of the time in different kinds of flights, perching the remainder of the time (about 2–6 minutes at each perch interspersed with brief flights). Another study found 13.7% and 10.7% of daylight at this later breeding stage to be in flight, the rest of time perching, with occasional inactive perching spells of around 15–40 minutes. However, that inactivity could last up to 5 hours during heavy rainfall. Breeding adults generally engage in agonistic behavior when an interloper of their sex is present; 11 responses showed that males responses consisted 64% of the provocations, 9% of the time by females and both members 27% of the time. Frequent aggressive interactions were recorded between females, often yearling and second year vs older females. The Cooper's hawk's threat display appears to consist of them lowering their heads, raising their "crest" (capital tract), stretching out their wings, spreading the tail and engaging in vocalizations. Stress levels, as indicated by a study of corticosterone levels, were considered quite high when hawks are being handled by researchers, particularly in males (indicating that they experience higher levels of stress than females). The Cooper's hawk is subject to frequent mobbing by various birds and some mammals, with good cause, but evidence shows that even main prey types like jays will sometimes shy away from engaging in full-fledged mobbing of a Cooper's, perhaps due to the risk in closely approach this very agile predator, which can in an instant suddenly turn and kill a member of the mob. Therefore, less dangerous hawks such as Buteos are mobbed more vigorously than the more dangerous Cooper's. Many potential prey will confine their response to a hawk of this species to vocal scolding and/or attempt escape before an attack occurs.

Migration

Like a majority of diurnal birds of prey in the Northern Hemisphere, the Cooper's hawk is a partial migrant. They tend to be most migratory in the north and largely to partially sedentary elsewhere. With individual exceptions, hawks of the species largely migrate out of nearly all of their range in southern Canada as well as cooler parts of the Pacific Northwest, essentially all of Montana and northern parts of surrounding states, the Dakotas (but for southern South Dakota), the northern parts of the Great Lake states, northern New York and much of New England. Despite being classed as sedentary, banding studies have revealed that many Cooper's hawks south of the typical migratory populations engage in some variety of seasonal winter movements. Migrants in the Florida Keys were determined via stable isotopes to have originated from mid-Atlantic states and the southeastern United States both (largely) south of the typical migratory range. While females in the urban areas of Tucson were sedentary (99%), about 6% of the females outside of the urban areas did not remain on their breeding grounds during winter. In British Columbia, many adults are non-migratory but juveniles do tend to migrate. From the Great Lakes region in particular, migrants appear to disperse in multiple directions to the south. Multi-directional movements, even to the north as well as potentially any other direction, are more common than previously thought in this and other migratory raptors, which has been previously described as "inefficient and indirect method of 'homing'". However, reaching regions where appropriate habitat and prey is available is probably far more significant in seasonal movements to birds of prey than climatic concerns. However, the three longest distance movements from southern California were all northbound, i.e. . In Lansing, Michigan, evidence has been found of individual Cooper's hawks being annually devoted to the same wintering grounds, presumably due to their high quality.

Migratory movements in the autumn are generally between late August to mid-October, peaking at the end of September and beginning of October in the east, but sometimes migration extend into November. Meanwhile, spring northward migration may be any time from the end of February to May, with the last ones leaving Mexico in April and very late individuals were passing over south Texas in late May. Generally, spring migration is more dispersed and less consistent than fall migration. There is evidence from the Great Lakes region that spring migration is occurring sooner due to warming temperatures in recent years. Passage appears to be timed to coincide with that of their main prey, medium-sized birds. In migration, first-year juveniles precede two-year-old hawks which themselves precede adults when moving south in fall. Furthermore, females of all ages tend to migrate sooner and spend longer in winter quarters than like-age males, the latter staying relatively north and traveling back again earlier. Interestingly, the sharp-shinned hawk (despite the even more dimorphic migration times between sexes) showed no strong difference in distance on migration between the sexes, unlike female Cooper's which sometimes can move considerably further than males. At regular western migration sites, the average difference of passage timing for Cooper's hawks of the earlier females and later males of like-age was five days. In the Marin Headlands, migration of the sexes differed by 6 days in juvenile, first-year females and males and by 11 days in older females and males. Like other Accipiters (but unlike falcons), Cooper's appear to not start moving until day is warmer and thermals can be used. During migration they favor mountain ridges and coastlines, which coincide with migratory raptors routes in general. This species can seem to cross some bodies of water unlike most sharp-shinned hawks but seldom do so over wide bodies of water. However, they have been seen to turn up in such oceanic vicinities as the Florida Keys and Cuba, and so are capable of crossing larger than usual bodies of water. It is thought that Cooper's hawks also avoid the Great Plains while migrating as well. Like many other raptors, Cooper's hawks favor strong northwesterly winds during autumn passage.

At coastal migration sites like Cape May, first year Cooper's hawks are far more regularly encountered than older individuals, with the juvenile Cooper's accounting for 92.7% of recorded individuals of the species (juveniles of various other raptor species also generally seem to favor coastal over montane migration when it is available). In Cape May, Cooper's hawks are the third most commonly recorded raptor species in passage behind the sharp-shinned hawk and the American kestrel (Falco sparverius) but are far less than numerous in migration or in winter in the nearby Delaware Bayshore locations of New Jersey than various other raptor species. Interestingly, in the Manzano Mountains and Goshute Mountains, juvenile sharp-shinned hawks were roughly twice as numerous as juvenile Cooper's hawks but the number of adults seen passing through of the two species was roughly the same. At the hawkwatch in Cedar Grove, Wisconsin, the Cooper's hawk was not among the most regular species, being the 6th most frequently most recorded species.<ref>Mueller, H. C., & Berger, D. D. (1961). Weather and fall migration of hawks at Cedar Grove, Wisconsin. The Wilson Bulletin, 73(2), 171–192.</ref> In central and southwestern Idaho, Cooper's hawk accounted for relatively few of the recorded raptors, i.e. 3.45% of 748 migrating raptors. A similarly low volume was observed relative to other bird of prey species in Yellowstone National Park, where the Cooper's was only the 9th most frequently observed out of 17 species and averaged only 50 hawks in passage over the course of autumn. Nonetheless, the Cooper's hawk was second only to sharp-shinned hawk as the most frequently recorded species seen migrating at nine major hawkwatchs throughout the western United States (and 1 in Canada) and, unlike the sharp-shinned, has shown a trend of increase in numbers overall in recent decades, despite some declines in numbers at Lipan Point and Bridger Range. The Cooper's hawk was the 7th most often recorded raptor at four migration sites along the Gulf Coast, being much more frequently identified in the site at Veracruz, Mexico than the ones in the United States, but showed an annual stability of numbers that many of the more numerous raptors (including sharp-shinned hawks) in passage did not. Along the Kittatinny Ridge in Pennsylvania, studied Cooper's hawks that were migrating from further north spent only 12% of the day actually migrating, devoting the remainder of their time to perching and hunting along their passage. Fat stores were measured to consist of 4–12% of the body mass of migrants, being higher in autumn than in spring, and higher on average in adults over younger hawks and in females over males. Flight speeds of hawks and crows. Auk, 60 :487–492. Typically Cooper's hawk migrate singly but sometimes can be seen in groups of two to five. Flocking is not typically engaged in by raptors who migrate using powered flight, such as Accipiters, falcons and harriers, but many Buteo hawks do form loose flocks. 96.3% of 806 observed Cooper's hawk seen migrating in Johnson County, Iowa were solitary, although 30 migrating pairs were seen together.

Diet

Hunting methods
Cooper's hawks are known as bold and aggressive predators. Given their dietary habits, these hawks bore a poor reputation well into the 20th century, with one account describing the species as "noxious", an "avian outlaw" and "a relentless tyrant and murderer of small birds". Another describes the species as "bloodthirsty" and a "villain".Taylor, W. P., & Shaw, W. T. (1927). Mammals and birds of Mount Rainier National Park. US Government Printing Office. Early accounts underestimated the opportunistic nature of the Cooper's hawks’ hunting behavior and provided little insight into the actual effect the hawks have on their prey. In another Michigan study, most Cooper's hawks were found to be flying  from their wooded nests to hunt on agricultural ground. Due to scattered prey availability in North Florida, females were nearly nomadic, wandering anywhere where food could be accessed (i.e. chicken farms, feedlots, bird feeders, etc.), while males were more typically devoted to hunting on their regular home range. During hunts, Cooper's hawks rely on agile, twisting flights between bouts of perching and scanning, their flight suddenly picking up speed upon approach to the prey. Hunting hawks typically use forest edge, open woodland and fencelines and such while hunting. In southwestern Tennessee, the preferred hunting habitats in the non-breeding season were forest, then woodland edge, then lastly open country. Near Stevens Point in Wisconsin, males prefer to hunt in quiet woods while females preferred to stay within  of the nest making males a more common sight.Rosenfield, R. N., & Bielefeldt, J. (1993). Trapping techniques for breeding Cooper's Hawks: two modifications. Journal of Raptor Research, 27: 170–171. This differed strongly in Tucson where hawks while hunting mostly in manmade environments such as residential areas, regional parks, and golf courses more so than they were prevalent in the environment, though usually where there were large (albeit usually non-native) trees.Boggie, M. A., & Mannan, R.W. (2014). Examining seasonal patterns of space use to gauge how an accipiter responds to urbanization. Landscape and Urban Planning, 124: 34–42. The Cooper's hawk does attack birds attracted to bird feeders with a fair amount of frequency.Dunn, E. H., & Tessaglia, D. L. (1994). Predation of birds at feeders in winter (Depredación de Aves en Comederos Durante el Invierno). Journal of Field Ornithology, 8–16. However, data from Indiana showed that birds using bird feeders were at no greater risk of attack than those in random transects, and the effect Cooper's can have on feeder birds may be at times exaggerated.
 
If it sees birds when flying, a hunting hawk does not fly directly to them but instead circles around to available trees and bushes often perching for a few moments before launching its attack. If birds become aware of it, the hawk will tend to quickly gain height in hopes of intercepting some prey. It was found compared to some other North American raptors who are more likely to watch for prey on the ground and/or in the open, that the Cooper's hawk had a rather enlarged binocular field. During hunts, these hawks may suddenly alight when detecting an available mammal. Sometimes, Cooper's hawks will engage in tandem hunts with one dashing around after the prey while another waits on the other side of a tree trunk or wooded thicket. Many birds are caught when they inadvertently fly around a tree where a hawk is inconspicuously perched. Young Cooper's are impetuous about crashing into bushes after prey, sometimes even into thorny cover such as barberries, whereas adults are said to be more "prudent". They may chase prey into cover or from bush to bush. The first instance of non-piratical scavenging on carrion was recorded when a Cooper's hawk was seen eating at a white-tailed deer (Odocoileus virginianus) carcass.

When hunting bats, they can follow all twists and turns, and may succeed in capture in up to 90% of hunts. Much like goshawk, sometimes Cooper's hawks will capture rabbits by pursuing on the ground, half-running, half-flying. Other on-foot hunting efforts, especially when chasing quail, have been detected as well. When hunting sparrows, Cooper's hawks may make multiple passes on a bush before success and the efforts can take up to 45 minutes. During hunts of rock doves (Columba livia) in urban areas, Cooper's hawks have been seen to engage in open air stoops to capture the prey.Clark, R. J. (1977). Cooper's Hawk hunting in the city. Auk, 94:142–143. An unusual harrier-like flight was seen in be engaged in by a Cooper's hawk before an attack on aquatic prey in a marsh. Most prey is killed by repeatedly kneading the talons, with the kneading sometimes going on even after death, although in some cases birds are plucked while still alive.Jones, S. (1979). Habitat management series for unique or endangered species. Report No. 17, the Accipiters. USDI-BLM Tech. Note 335. Despite its gracile appearance, the Cooper's hawk, like the northern goshawk, is extremely powerful for its size and presumably able to capture larger prey relative to its size than other raptors such as falcons and Buteos (including red-tailed hawks (Buteo jamaicensis)) due to its unusually high-speed foot velocity and resulting impact during prey captures.Sustaita, D. (2008). Musculoskeletal underpinnings to differences in killing behavior between North American accipiters (Falconiformes: Accipitridae) and falcons (Falconidae). Journal of Morphology, 269(3), 283–301. At times, after capture, Cooper's hawk have been seen to hold still living prey underwater, presumably trying to drown it.Forbush, E. H. (1927). Birds of Massachusetts and other New England states. Part II. Land birds from Bobwhites to Grackles. Mass. Dept. Subsequent to the preys’ demise, they may eat the victim head first, followed by the viscera, with the meat eaten lastly. Like other raptors who most regularly take birds, the Cooper's hawk was profiled in a study as an "attacker" rather than a "searcher" (i.e. mammal-hunters such as Buteos). "Attackers" such as Accipiters and large falcons usually had lower average hunting success rates, which averaged among the attacker species at 27%, due to the difficulty of capturing the prey. 33% of 45 observed hunts in a study in Missouri were successful. In Terre Haute, Indiana, about 23% of attacks by male Cooper's hawks and 20% by females were successful and were far more prone to being carried out in relatively open areas than those of nearby sharp-shinned hawk. Post-fledgling parties of hawks in Wisconsin were seen to hunt in sibling groups of 2–4, mainly pursuing chipmunks, and were observed to succeed in 56% of 18 hunting attempts. During the first six weeks after the young hatch, in New York, it was estimated that a male Cooper's hawk would need to procure about 66 prey items over the period. In these first six weeks in California, it was thought a minimum of  would be required per nestling per day.

Prey spectrum

Cooper's hawk may consume well over 300 prey species from across the range. This predator is known to consume vertebrate prey almost exclusively. Often smallish or medium-sized birds are the preferred food, but also many small mammals and, in more arid vicinities, lizards are regularly taken. Infrequently, frogs may be eaten, as will (rarely) insects and fish in nearly dry watercourse.Smith, A. P. (1915). Birds of the Boston Mountains, Arkansas. The Condor, 17(1), 41–57. Birds in general form about 50–85% of diet. One estimate is that globally birds form about 71.1% of the diet, 17.9% mammals, 8.9% reptiles and 2.1% other prey. Cooper's hawks generally prefers birds that inhabit the ground or shrub level within the local habitats. One study unusually found no strong dimorphism in the foods selected by males and females.

Birds

Predation rates and passerines
Birds are by far the leading prey for Cooper's hawks in most areas. A wide diversity of birds, considerably over 250 species, are known to be taken, constituting more than three-quarters of known prey species for these hawks. A Cooper's hawk is estimated to kill an average of two birds a day, or 700 birds a year. Although prior data mostly reflected the taking of adult birds, a study in Wisconsin revealed that Cooper's hawks may largely take young of the year, mostly fledglings but also not infrequently nestlings, during the breeding season. 74% of ageable bird prey in this study were young of the year. Similarly, in Michigan during summer, immature birds were more than 2.5 times more often delivered to Cooper's hawk nests than adult birds. In one case, a Cooper's hawk was seen to fly away with an entire occupied nest of American goldfinches (Spinus tristis). One study determined that birds that nest in the canopy level tended to nest fairly close to this hawk but those with mid-level, shrub level and ground level nests nested farther away, indicating that non-canopy-nesting birds are generally taken during the breeding season. Key to prey selection for Cooper's hawk is the availability and abundance of birds in a given region. Therefore, the extremely numerous American robin (Turdus migratorius) appears to be the most widely reported prey species. Robins were the leading prey species in northwestern Oregon, at 19.6% of 281 prey items, Lopez Island, Washington, 23.4% of 107 prey items, in Victoria, British Columbia, at 34.6% of 2896 prey items and prominent but ranked second also in California (Berkeley and Albany) food studies, 24.5% of 1057 prey items. The robin is regularly hunted in all seasons due to its commonality in exurban regions, with both adults, at estimated averages of  when taken, and young being relatively easy for them to access. Beyond the common robin, nearly all thrushes in North America (excluding one species whose breeding range is largely north of the Cooper's range and one rare, little-studied species) are opportunistically hunted by Cooper's hawks.Sherrod, S. K. (1978). Diets of North American Falconiformes. Raptor Res, 12(3/4), 49–121.Bowen, R. V. (1997). Townsend's Solitaire (Myadestes townsendi), version 2.0. In The Birds of North America (A. F. Poole and F. B. Gill, Editors). Cornell Lab of Ornithology, Ithaca, NY, USA. The starling was the main food for these hawks in Ithaca, New York, at 28.2% of 857 prey items, and Terre Haute, Indiana, at 56.5% of 57 prey items, and taken in large but somewhat secondary numbers in Missouri, Michigan, and Victoria, British Columbia. In the urban environment of Terre Haute, it was found that starlings were taken in almost the same proportion as starlings were of all birds observed by researchers (i.e. they were 60% of 2146 individual birds seen).

Somewhat over 60% of the bird species known in the Cooper's hawks’ prey spectrum are passerines (including thrushes and starlings). Other medium-sized to largish-bodied families of passerines tend to be most often selected. In many circumstances, Cooper's hawks will hunt corvids, large, intelligent and social passerines, with the smallish jays being particularly popular. In Missouri, the most often selected prey (12.7% of 259 prey items) was the  blue jay (Cyanocitta cristata), which also important in northern Florida, i.e. 12.27% of 1100 prey items. Steller's jays (Cyanocitta stelleri), at  a larger western cousin of the blue jay, are also regularly selected in various studies, such as all studied areas of Oregon and New Mexico, where it was the second most regularly selected of prey species at 11.7% of 316 prey items.Kennedy, P. L. (1992). Reproductive strategies of Northern Goshawks and Cooper's Hawks in north-central New Mexico. Phd, University of Utah. California scrub jays (Aphelocoma californica) are regular supplemental prey in northern California studies as well. Blue jays and other related species are among the most diligent mobbing birds in response to the presence of a Cooper's hawk although sometimes may let out an alarm call or even imitate a Cooper's calls merely to frighten other birds from a desired food source.Hailman, J. P., McGowan, K. J., & Woolfenden, G. E. (1994). Role of helpers in the sentinel behaviour of the Florida scrub jay (Aphelocoma c. coerulescens). Ethology, 97(1‐2), 119–140. It was hypothesized that Steller's jays may be able to effectively confuse a Cooper's hawk by engaging in a chorus of calls at close range. In Arizona, Mexican jays (Aphelocoma ultramarina) are known to play a key role in flicker ecology by watching out for Cooper's hawks. Numerous other corvids may be hunted, including most overlapping jays, as well as the Clark's nutcracker (Nucifraga columbiana), black-billed magpie (Pica hudsonius), possibly yellow-billed magpie (Pica nuttalli) and a few species of crow.Balda, R. P., & Bateman, G. C. (1971). Flocking and annual cycle of the pinon jay, Gymnorhinus cyanocephalus. Condor, 287–302. One black-billed magpie was caught and killed by a Cooper's hawk when attempting to mob the hawk. Incidents of predation have been witnessed on both young and adult American crow (Corvus brachyrhynchos), as well as on adult northwestern crow (Corvus caurinus). These hawks are also a potential predator of fish crow (Corvus ossifragus).McNicholl, M. K. (2012). Cooper’s Hawk predation on Northwestern Crow. Journal of the British Columbia Field Ornithologists, 22.Reese, J. G. (2015). Fish Crows (Corvus ossifragus) Utilize Unusual Nesting Location and Habitat. Maryland Birdlife, 64(1), 42–50. However, crows are potentially dangerous prey to Cooper's hawks. Adult American crows are about the same size as a female Cooper's hawk and can potentially cause considerable damage to a lone raptor during group mobbing, being capable of inflicting damage with both their feet and bill. In at least one case, a murder of American crows was observed to drive a Cooper's hawk to the ground and possibly seriously injure it, although the fate of the hawk was not certain. Cases of missing toes on Cooper's hawks are thought to have possibly come from failed predation of crows. At least a dozen species of icterid are known to be hunted by Cooper's hawks as well. Common, widespread icterids such as red-winged blackbirds (Agelaius phoeniceus) and common grackles (Quiscalus quiscula) are fairly frequent prey for these hawks. Cooper's hawks nesting near red-winged blackbird colonies may at times live almost entirely off of female blackbirds. In the Black Hills, although prey species were seldom identified, evidence showed that most regularly selected prey were assorted icterids. Even meadowlarks, such as the  eastern meadowlark (Sturnella magna) which was the third most often selected prey in Ithaca, New York, and bobolinks (Dolichonyx oryzivorus) are taken despite their preference for grasslands well outside the typical habitats of Cooper's hawks.

Other passerines families (i.e. outside thrushes, corvids and icterids) tend to not be as large-bodied and, although by no means neglected, are seldom equal in overall dietary importance (biomass). About 15 species of tyrant flycatcher, several species each of vireo, swallows, tits, nuthatches, wrens, mimids, about a dozen species of finch, cardinalids and a huge diversity of American sparrows and New World warblers (nearly 30 species each) are known to be taken by Cooper's hawks. A lower diversity are taken of shrikes, larks, penduline tits, aegithalids, treecreepers, dippers, silky-flycatchers and longspurs. The more numerous native passerines, such as northern cardinals (Cardinalis cardinalis) and northern mockingbirds (Mimus polyglottos), have good reason to fear these hawks as they are widely and regularly taken as are even common birds of less than half their size (around ), such as song sparrows (Melospiza melodia), dark-eyed juncos (Junco hiemalis) and house finches (Haemorhous mexicanus).Duncan, W. J., & Bednekoff, P. A. (2006). Singing in the shade: song and song posts of northern cardinals near nesting Cooper’s hawks. Canadian journal of zoology, 84(6), 916–919. During harsh late winter weather in Wisconsin, Cooper's hawks were recorded to eke out an existence living largely off of pine siskins (Spinus pinus). In modern terms, certainly the most commonly taken small bird would be the non-native,  house sparrow (Passer domesticus). Although not known to be taken profusely in all studied urban locales, house sparrows were the leading prey in a study from Michigan, were nearly a third of observed delivered prey at nests in Victoria, British Columbia (although were outnumbered by robins in prey remains) and reportedly were the leading prey in Milwaukee and in Grand Forks, North Dakota. Flycatchers are not hugely significant in the Cooper's hawk's foods, but the local effect of the hawks on populations can be considerable. For example, willow flycatchers (Empidonax traillii) in California suffered a 76% rate of nest predation, among which Cooper's hawks were a considerable contributor, and dusky flycatchers (Empidonax oberholseri) experienced a rate of 96% predation elsewhere in California, with 25% attributable to Cooper's.Liebezeit, J. R., & George, T. L. (2002). Nest predators, nest-site selection, and nesting success of the Dusky Flycatcher in a managed ponderosa pine forest. The Condor, 104(3), 507–517. Similar determent to the local nesting attempts of other small passerines such as warblers has also been reported.Stake, M. M., Faaborg, J., & Thompson, F. R. (2004). Video identification of predators at golden-cheeked warbler nests. Journal of Field Ornithology, 75(4), 337–344. Chickadees seem to regard Cooper's hawks as a moderate threat based on their anti-predator response, with smaller raptors (which are presumably more dangerous) such as sharp-shinned hawks and small owls evoking a rather more aggressive response by chickadees.Soard, C. M., & Ritchison, G. (2009). ‘Chick-a-dee’calls of Carolina chickadees convey information about degree of threat posed by avian predators. Animal Behaviour, 78(6), 1447–1453. While usually the smallest avian prey selected by Cooper's hawks are various warblers (presumably taken mainly by male hawks), down to the size of the  Wilson's warbler (Cardellina pusilla), even smaller passerines are known to be hunted. The smallest known avian prey species have included the  verdin (Auriparus flaviceps), the  ruby-crowned kinglet (Regulus calendula) and the  bushtit (Psaltriparus minimus).Webster, M. D. (1999). Verdin (Auriparus flaviceps), version 2.0. In The Birds of North America (A. F. Poole and F. B. Gill, Editors). Cornell Lab of Ornithology, Ithaca, NY, USA. Even smaller birds, the hummingbirds, are essentially immune to Cooper's hawks (due to their own extreme agility) and were seen to incidentally benefit from nesting close to the hawks in California, due to a low risk of predators approaching while the hawks are present.Greeney, H. F., Meneses, M. R., Hamilton, C. E., Lichter-Marck, E., Mannan, R. W., Snyder, N., Wethington, S.M. & Dyer, L. A. (2015). Trait-mediated trophic cascade creates enemy-free space for nesting hummingbirds. Science advances, 1(8), e1500310.

Columbids and woodpeckers

Outside of passerines, almost certainly the most important avian prey type is the pigeon and dove family. Mourning doves appear to be hunted regularly in almost any part of the two species’ mutual range. In Tucson, recent data shows that Cooper's hawks are living almost exclusively on doves. Among 151 prey items there, mourning doves were 20.5% by number and 27.5% of the biomass, Inca doves (Columbina inca) were 18.5% by number and 12.2% of the biomass and white-winged dove (Zenaida asiatica) 17.2% by number and 27.1% of the biomass. In Terre Haute, Indiana, mourning doves and rock doves were 14% and 21% of the diet, respectively. In northern California, mourning doves were the main prey species, making up 25.6% of 1057 prey items. There is even evidence that bluebirds have perceived the change in preference of Cooper's hawks to more profitable prey such as doves in developed areas and show less inhibition to the hawk's presence. In the more rural north Florida, again the mourning dove leads the prey selection, accounting for 16.5% of 1100 prey items. Another popular prey family is the woodpeckers. A rather numerous and widely distributed species, the  northern flicker (Colaptes auratus), is a particular dietary staple of Cooper's hawks, being about the third most widely reported prey species. The flicker was the main prey in northern New Mexico, at 22.5% of 316 prey items, and in southern Wisconsin, at 22% of 77 prey items.Errington, P. L. (1933). Food habits of southern Wisconsin raptors. Part II. Hawks. The Condor, 35(1), 19–29. Flickers are common prey elsewhere as well, such as in Ithaca, New York. Medium-sized woodpeckers, such as red-headed woodpeckers (Melanerpes erythrocephalus) and red-bellied woodpeckers (Melanerpes carolinus) were important secondary prey in different parts of the range. In South Carolina, it was found that 15% of the red-headed woodpeckers in a study population were killed by hawks.Vukovich, M., & Kilgo, J. C. (2009). Notes on breeding sharp-shinned hawks and Cooper's hawks in Barnwell County, South Carolina. Southeastern Naturalist, 8(3), 547–552. All told, about 20 species (almost all in North America but for a couple poorly-studied species) of woodpecker are known to be taken, ranging from the smallest, the  downy woodpecker (Picoides pubescens), to the largest, the  pileated woodpecker (Dryocopus pileatus). The response of woodpeckers to a sighted Cooper's hawks varies, with evidence showing that downy woodpecker and flickers would behave more boldly and themselves may scold the hawk if part of a mixed flock but, if alone, the woodpecker will typically try to flee.Sullivan, K. (1985). Selective alarm calling by downy woodpeckers in mixed-species flocks. The Auk, 184–187. Despite the regularity of predation of woodpeckers that are in the open, a study in British Columbia shows indicated Cooper's hawks seldom prey upon woodpecker nests, perhaps due to being unable to access their secluded, smallish nest holes, with the study showing that the most regular predators of such nests were various mammals (from deermice to bears).

Galliforms
Certainly the most controversial aspect of the Cooper's hawks are their predations upon galliforms. By far the most regularly selected types are New World quails. Coveys of quails that attempt to evade predators by running into thick vegetation (which can allow them to successfully escape many predators) often find that Cooper's hawks are undeterred by this, as the hawks may chase them either on the wing or on foot into thickets. However, one grouse was seen to successfully evade a hunting Cooper's hawk by diving belly first into about a foot of snow. Cooper's hawks are often regarded as perhaps the most regular natural predator of northern bobwhites (Colinus virginianus). Indeed, the rate of predation by Cooper's does appear to exceed that committed by other species of hawk as well as that by large owls.Cox, S. A., Peoples, A. D., DeMaso, S. J., Lusk, J. J., & Guthery, F. S. (2004). Survival and cause‐specific mortality of northern bobwhites in western Oklahoma. The Journal of Wildlife Management, 68(3), 663–671.Terhune, T. M., Sisson, D. C., Palmer, W. E., Stribling, H. L., & Carroll, J. P. (2008). Raptor predation of Northern Bobwhite nests. Journal of Raptor Research, 42(2), 148–150. For instance, during winter in Wisconsin, Cooper's hawks were thought to kill 3.4–12.5% of the local bobwhite population. However, the bobwhite appears to be a secondary prey species in all known studies and there is no evidence that Cooper's hawk predation alone can deplete bobwhite populations, unlike causes directly contributable to man such as overhunting and habitat destruction. In Washington state, female Cooper's hawks took many California quails (Callipepla californica), which were estimated to constitute 47% of the prey selected by female hawks, but there was far too little impact overall to affect the quail's overall population. In the rural areas outside of Tucson, Gambel's quail (Callipepla gambelii) were found to be the most regularly selected prey species, at 15.2% of 79 prey items. A study of pellets in northwestern Mexico to determine if the local Cooper's hawks were regularly taking Montezuma quail (Cyrtonyx montezumae), finding that only one pellet consisted entirely of quail, the other pellets showing that hawks were mainly taking other prey, mostly doves. Most regularly found galliforms in North America (including well-established exotics such as chukars (Alectoris chukar) and common pheasants (Phasianus colchicus)) are known to fall prey occasionally to Cooper's hawks.Christensen, G. C. (1996). Chukar (Alectoris chukar), version 2.0. In The Birds of North America (A. F. Poole and F. B. Gill, Editors). Cornell Lab of Ornithology, Ithaca, NY, USA. These include assorted native grouse, including even the grassland-dwelling species (but excluding the more northerly distributed ptarmigans).Johnson, J. A., M. A. Schroeder, and L. A. Robb (2011). Greater Prairie-Chicken (Tympanuchus cupido), version 2.0. In The Birds of North America (A. F. Poole, Editor). Cornell Lab of Ornithology, Ithaca, NY, USA. Juveniles usually are the more vulnerable and more regularly taken of non-quail galliforms by Cooper's hawks, but the hawks can take adults quite regularly despite the prey's relatively large size. Adult ruffed grouse (Bonasa umbellus), weighing an estimated mean of  when taken, are not infrequently exploited as prey, while adult sooty grouse (Dendragapus fuliginosus), estimated to weigh  when taken have also been known to be taken repeatedly.Jewett, S. G. (1953). Birds of Washington state. University of Washington Press. Adult male sharp-tailed grouse (Tympanuchus phasianellus), which average , are also known have been successfully preyed upon by Cooper's hawks.Swensen, J. E. & Eng, R.L. (1984). Autumn weights of Plains Sharp-tailed Grouse in Montana. Prairie Naturalist, 16: 49–54. Even more impressive accounts show adult common pheasant estimated to weigh up to  can be preyed upon by Cooper's hawks. However, given that this is of enormous size relative to a Cooper's hawk, it would require verification that the turkey was this large and was taken alive by the hawk. Not unexpectedly, turkey poults are known to fall prey to Cooper's hawks.

Other birds
Beyond aforementioned families and orders, other types of birds are taken relatively infrequently. Usually moderate to low numbers of water birds are taken of any variety. About 5 species each of duck and heron, a dozen species of shorebird and a smaller assortment of grebes and rails are known in the prey spectrum. Even among water birds, nonetheless, a wide diversity may be taken, from the tiny  least sandpiper (Calidris minutilla) to an adult mallard (Anas platyrhynchos) estimated to weigh  when taken.Kus, B. E., Ashman, P., Page, G. W., & Stenzel, L. E. (1984). Age-related mortality in a wintering population of Dunlin. The Auk, 101(1), 69–73. Adult ducks and herons of roughly equal weight to Cooper's hawks and other largish adult water birds including ring-billed gulls (Larus delewarensis) and American coots (Fulica americana) are sometimes tackled by these hawks. Particularly frequency was recorded of  cattle egrets (Bubulcus ibis) in north Florida, where the egrets were the fourth most regularly recorded prey species. Assorted families of land birds are fairly rare as reported in food studies, including some nightjars, trogons, swifts, kingfishers, parrots and assorted other raptorial birds.Schwitters, L., D. Schwitters, E. L. Bull, and C. T. Collins (2019). Vaux's Swift (Chaetura vauxi), version 3.0. In The Birds of North America (P. G. Rodewald, Editor). Cornell Lab of Ornithology, Ithaca, NY, USA.Hiraldo, F., Delibes, M., Bustamante, J., & Estrella, R. R. (1991). Overlap in the diets of diurnal raptors breeding at the Michilia Biosphere Reserve, Durango, Mexico. J. Rap. Res., 25: 25–29.

Mammals

A lower diversity of species and lower overall numbers of mammals are taken relative to bird prey but mammalian prey can be locally important. Chipmunks are often regularly hunted in various regions, though only about one-third of North American chipmunks are known in the prey spectrum.Thorington Jr, R. W., Koprowski, J. L., Steele, M. A., & Whatton, J. F. (2012). Squirrels of the world. JHU Press.Best, T. L., & Granai, N. J. (1994). Tamias merriami. Mammalian Species, (476), 1–9. High balances of the relatively large  eastern chipmunk (Tamias striatus) were found in studies from New York, Michigan and Wisconsin. The eastern chipmunk appeared to dominate the foods of Cooper's hawks in the Green Ridge State Forest in Maryland, at 49.1% of 57 prey items and mammals altogether made up an exceptional 66.9% of the foods. In the western United States, fewer chipmunks are identifiable but such prey is fairly commonly detected. High balances of chipmunks were found in food studies from Oregon, especially in eastern Oregon where chipmunks (unidentified to species) were the leading prey type, at 22.5% of 120 prey items. The most common chipmunk prey in Oregon is probably the  Townsend's chipmunk (Neotamias townsendii) but the Cooper's hawks may take chipmunks down to the size of the  least chipmunk (Neotamias minimus).Bergstom, B. (1999). Least Chipmunk (Tamias minimus). Pp. 366–369 in D Wilson, S Ruff, eds. Smithsonian Book of North American Mammals. Washington, D.C.: Smithsonian Institution Press in Association with the American Society of Mammalogists. Mammals distantly related to chipmunks, such as ground squirrels (including antelope squirrels) can be taken in locally high volume. Golden-mantled ground squirrels (Callospermophilus lateralis) were the second most important prey in eastern Oregon at 16.6%. Thirteen-lined ground squirrels (Ictidomys tridecemlineatus) were the second most common prey species in a study from Wisconsin and also important in the diet in North Dakota (where they were the most significant contributor of biomass, constituting 23.4%). Golden-mantled and thirteen-lined ground squirrels are fairly small for ground squirrels, the earlier averaging , the latter of similar size. Age differences in the response of California ground Squirrels (Spermophilus beecheyi) to avian and mammalian predators. Journal of Comparative Psychology, 111(2), 174. Tree squirrels are widely taken but secondary prey for Cooper's hawks. The smallish, roughly  American red squirrel (Tamiasciurus hudsonicus) are not infrequent prey in northerly locations. About 36 red squirrels were recorded in the foods of Cooper's hawk in Ithaca, New York and these squirrels appear to have specific alarm calls that are provoked by these hawks, however the rate of predation by Cooper's appears to be low relative to other predators overall.Greene, E., & Meagher, T. (1998). Red squirrels, Tamiasciurus hudsonicus, produce predator-class specific alarm calls. Animal Behaviour, 55(3), 511–518. Reported when taking red squirrels, male Cooper's hawks, being relatively small, may tear the prey into pieces that can be transported by them to the nest. Numerous other tree squirrels are taken occasionally by Cooper's hawks.Kneeland, M. C., Koprowski, J. L., & Corse, M. C. (1995). Potential Predators of Chiricahua Fox Squirrels (Sciurus nayaritensis chiricahuae). The Southwestern Naturalist, 40(3), 340–342. Sizes of tree squirrels taken by Cooper's hawks were studied in Missouri.

About 20 non-sciurid rodent species may be taken by Coopers hawks but are rarely significant in the foods. Both American species of flying squirrels, woodrats, commoner Peromyscus mice, some species of vole and lemming, cotton rats, jumping mice, kangaroo rats and non-native rodents may all be prey occasionally, although most species of these are fairly nocturnal and thus of limited access. Few of these types of rodents are taken frequently enough to warrant much individual mention. In North Dakota, Peromyscus mice made up an unusually high 13.5% of the foods. In the city of Burnaby, when bird feeders began to attract black rats (Rattus rattus), Cooper's hawk's came to locally take significant numbers of both young and adult rats. The first verified predation by a Cooper's hawk on a brown rat (Rattus norvegicus) was recently reported, also in British Columbia. One broad study found a somewhat unexpected correlation was found positively relating the previous summer's rodent density to the number of Cooper's hawks. This could be coincidental as rodent populations are probably driven by acorn production in the year prior to the rodent increases, and many of the birds taken regularly by Cooper's are also partially acorn dependent. Occasionally, Cooper's hawks may capture profitable mammalian prey such as rabbits and hares. Mainly, predation has been reported on the cottontail rabbits. Strong numbers of mountain cottontail (Sylvilagus nuttallii), averaging about  when taken, were reported in northwestern Oregon (7.82% and fifth most regular prey species). In the rural vicinity of Tucson, cottontail rabbits were the second most regularly selected type of prey, at 12.7%. Fairly strong numbers of cottontails were also reported in New Mexico and Durango. In Missouri, the widely found eastern cottontail (Sylvilagus floridanus) was the most significant contributor of biomass, making up 14.5% of the total biomass. Various species of non-cottontail leporids may occasionally be caught, including young black-tailed jackrabbits (Lepus californicus), pygmy rabbits (Brachylagus idahoensis) as well as fairly large numbers of feral European rabbits (Oryctolagus cuniculus) in Victoria, British Columbia.

Mammals of other orders are taken quite infrequently, with a low volume of shrews and moles reported. Cooper's hawks are considered a potential predator of the smaller species of weasel and were recorded in Florida to kill a striped skunk (Mephitis mephitis) kit estimated to weigh about .Linnell, M. A., Epps, C. W., Forsman, E. D., & Zielinski, W. J. (2017). Survival and predation of weasels (Mustela erminea, Mustela frenata) in North America. Northwest science, 91(1), 15–26. Occasionally, Cooper's hawks are known to hunt bats. They are said to usually capture bats on the wing rather than search them out. Findings were that in Carlsbad Caverns that Cooper's (and also sharp-shinned) hawks were the most efficient avian predators of bats near the cave entrance (rating as more successful than most Buteo hawks and particularly more so than larger and less agile raptors like red-tailed hawks and large owls). Per observation in Carlsbad, due to their agility, the Cooper's can match the evasive flight of a bat and may be successful in about 90% of observed pursuits. Apart from their well-documented predation of Mexican free-tailed bats (Tadarida brasiliensis), quite little is known about which bat species Cooper's hawk's may prey upon and at what level do the local hawks depend on such prey. Apart from caves, sometimes Cooper's hawks have been seen to capture bats in urbanized areas.Sprunt Jr., A. (1950). Hawk predation at the bat caves of Texas. Texas J. Sci, 2 (4): 462–470.

Other prey
In some areas, respectable numbers of reptiles may be hunted. All told, nearly 30 species of reptile may be hunted by Cooper's hawks. In the eastern part of the range, even in biodiverse locations for reptilian species such as Florida, a very low volume of such prey are reportedly taken by Cooper's hawks. In Arkansas, a small sample of road-killed Cooper's hawks showed that small reptiles were more common than birds amongst the stomach contents, with Bougainville's skinks (Lerista bougainvillii) and ring-necked snakes (Diadophis punctatus) constituting about 40% of the diet. Strong detection of reptilian prey is known in more western locations, especially farther south. In fact, of avian predators in one Californian study's estimation, the Cooper's hawks showed the most reliance on lizards locally, but that the Cooper's was not locally common in the study area so had relatively limited impact. Predation cost of conspicuous male coloration in collared lizards (Crotaphytus collaris): an experimental test using clay‐covered model lizards. Ethology, 112(6), 572–580. In rural areas outside of Tucson, a fairly strong presence of (unidentified to species) spiny lizards, at 13% of 77 prey items, although overall in all areas of the Tucson metropolitan, reptiles constituted a lower 8% of the total 228 prey items. In Durango, reptiles were a pronounced part of the Cooper's hawk diet. Here, the most frequently identified prey species was the Mexican Plateau horned lizard (Phrynosoma orbiculare) (11.5% of 191 prey items), followed by the northern flicker and thirdly the crevice spiny lizard (Sceloporus poinsettia) (10.47%, plus other unidentified spiny lizards making up a further 4.2% of the diet). In Arizona, spiny lizards were similarly detected to have a strong prey-predator relationship with Cooper's hawks as well. Most lizards encountered and hunted by Cooper's hawks are fairly small but, despite being more scarcely selected, snake prey may show greater size variation. Snakes of Virginia. Univ. of Virginia Press, Charlottesville, VA. Unlike with reptiles, there is little evidence that the Cooper's hawk regularly hunts amphibians in any area, despite a few species being known in the prey spectrum. While some authors have posited that as much as 2.1% of the Cooper's hawks global prey consists of invertebrates, prevailing food studies tend to find scant to none evidence of such prey; however, a truly exceptional case of Cooper's hawks found dead in Arkansas showed that beetles and moths/butterflies each represented 12.5% of detected prey items.

Interspecific predatory relationships

Of special interest is how Cooper's hawks live along the other two Accipiters native to North America. Little distinguishes outright the distribution, habitat, ecology and prey spectrum of sharp-shinned hawks from Cooper's hawks. Throughout the range of the Cooper's hawk, sharp-shins may be found breeding, migrating and wintering in similar areas. So too is there much overlap between the ranges of Cooper's hawks and northern goshawks, such as throughout southern Canada, the western United States, the Upper Midwest (and sometimes in the Northeastern United States) and during times of passage. In general, sharp-shinned hawks tend to use younger and denser stands of trees than do Cooper's. Meanwhile, goshawks tend to favor old-growth forest area with taller and older trees and generally lower tree densities. However, all three species prefer fairly enclosed canopies over their nesting areas, i.e. canopy coverage are generally thought to need to be at least at 60–70%. A particular opportunity was taken to study the three Accipiters ecology when living near one another in Oregon. However, the patch habitat and dietary behavior of each species was still fairly partitioned. Here, for sharp-shinned hawks, the tree stands averaged 22–50 years old and had a mean density of 1180 trees per hectare (ha), while the Cooper's stands averaged 30–70 years old and had a mean of 907 trees per ha while the goshawk used in oldest and most open stands, with trees of an average age of 150 years, and a mean of 482 trees per ha.Reynolds, R. T. (1983). Management of western coniferous forest habitat for nesting accipiter hawks. U.S. Dep. Agric. For. Serv. Rocky Mtn. For. and Range Exp. Stn. The data from the Jemez Mountains of New Mexico was largely corresponding with the goshawk occurring in areas with a median of 781 trees per ha, the Cooper's in areas with a median of 1229 trees per ha and the sharp-shins in a median of 1482 tree per ha. In the New Mexico data, goshawks used the largest trees with the lowest median canopy coverage (77.4% vs 78.4% for Cooper'
s and 83.1% for sharp-shins). There is often some level of distinction in habitat between the Cooper's and the sharp-shinned hawk. Compared to sharp-shinned hawks in Wisconsin and Oregon, Cooper's hawks use woods with fewer conifers, less dense stands of trees and stands with taller trees. Often, sharp-shinned hawk nests are lower in the trees and placed in much denser vegetation (often even the sharp-shins with their smaller frames themselves accidentally strike against branches while attempting to enter the nest), to hide the nest more sufficiently against predators.Trexel, D. R., Rosenfield, R. N., Bielefeldt, J., & Jacobs, E. A. (1999). Comparative nest site habitats in Sharp-shinned and Cooper's hawks in Wisconsin. The Wilson Bulletin, 7–14. The habitat used by the two species in Missouri was less distinct (i.e. similar tree species used). There was some level of temporal differences between the two species in study in Indiana, where the Cooper's hawks were generally active in the early morning but sharp-shinned hawks did not become active until later in the morning (hypothetically to avoid more severe interguild predation by large owls due to its smaller size). In northern New Jersey, compared to nesting goshawks, the Cooper's hawks used flatter lands that were closer to roads, other openings and human habitations. However, canopy coverage averaged high in New Jersey data for Cooper's, at 89.1%.

However, data shows that in North America, the Accipiters home range size corresponded to the birds’ body size, i.e.  mean for the goshawk and  mean for the sharp-shinned hawk. The aforementioned Oregon studies also studied at length the dietary differences between the three American Accipiters. The amount of mammals in the diet in Oregon also increased with the body size of the species. The diets of the three species were also studied in the Chiricahua Mountains of Arizona. There was some diet overlap in preferred prey for the Cooper's hawks with both other Accipiters. In the case of the goshawk and the Cooper's, both hawks regularly took Steller's jays and band-tailed pigeons (Patagioenas fasciata). With the sharp-shinned hawk, the Cooper's locally also shared a liking for American robins and black-headed grosbeaks (Pheucticus melanocephalus). However, unlike either other Accipiter in the Chiricahuas, the Cooper's hawks regularly took chipmunks and lizards as well. When chickens were experimentally exposed to each of the three American Accipiters, they reacted the most aggressively to the sharp-shinned hawk (as they pose little to no threat to adult poultry), intermediately to Cooper's and with strong attempts to evade and escape when exposed to the goshawk, which is very capable and ready to dispatch adult poultry. Determinants of predation risk in small wintering birds: the hawk’s perspective. Behavioral Ecology and Sociobiology, 60(2), 195–204. Also, the sharp-shinned hawk appears to hunt more so birds that dwell at the canopy level in the woodlands (as opposed to ground to shrub height-dwelling birds) within the forest and prefers to attack in heavier cover than the Cooper's seemingly.

The ecology of Cooper's hawks has also been studied in contrast to other diurnal raptors as well. In the raptor guild within southern Michigan, the overall food breadth and size was studied against red-tailed hawks, red-shouldered hawks and American kestrels. Food-niche relationships and guild structure of diurnal birds of prey: competition versus opportunism. Canadian Journal of Zoology, 61(10), 2230–2241. In the Wisconsin data, the red-shouldered, the broad-winged and rough-legged hawks (Buteo lagopus) as well as the northern harrier, peregrine falcon (Falco peregrinus) and the American kestrel all had lower mean prey masses. Much farther south in Durango, Mexico, while there was overlap in the class of prey selected by Cooper's hawks with the other studied raptor species, American kestrels, red-tailed and zone-tailed hawks (Buteo albonotatus), there was minimal overlap in which prey species were usually selected, especially given the difference in habitat usage. Furthermore, in Durango, while Cooper's and the Buteo hawks all took appreciable numbers of adult cotton rats, kestrels selected only young cotton rats. In a study in western Maryland, Cooper's hawks used more mature woodland with a more developed understory and more extensive ground cover than the other woodland nesting hawks, the broad-winged and red-shouldered hawks. While red-tailed hawks nested fairly high in the Maryland data in isolated pines somewhat out of the interior forest, the Cooper's nests were at similar height in forest and slightly higher than those of red-shouldered hawks and much higher than those of broad-winged hawks. In what was probably a case of defense of their hunting ground, a female Cooper's hawk was recorded to attack and drive off (without physical contact) a larger peregrine falcon from a perch during winter in Ontario.

The Cooper's hawk is usually a top predator in the daytime but is not immune from attack by other predators.Fremlin, K. (2018). Trophic magnification of legacy persistent organic pollutants and emergent contaminants within a terrestrial food-web of an avian apex predator, the Cooper's Hawk (Accipiter cooperii) (Doctoral dissertation, Science: Biological Sciences Department). The worst predator of this species is almost certainly the great horned owl (Bubo virginianus). This rather large owl (averaging more than three times heavier than a Cooper's hawk) is known to regularly track down fledglings and adults as well as raid the nests of other birds of prey. Many records show great horned owls will visit the nests of birds of prey and pick off the young nightly until the prey resource is exhausted (i.e. all young or sometimes adult birds of prey are killed). Furthermore, given the opportunity, great horned owls readily expropriate the nests built by the raptors they kill as their own. Given its preference for secluded wooded spots near woodland openings, Cooper's hawks are frequently the subject of unwanted attention from horned owls.Wiley, J. W. (1975). Relationships of nesting hawks with Great Horned Owl. The Auk, 92(1), 157–159. Both the young, especially around the time they leave the nest or are recently fledged, and adult Cooper's hawks are vulnerable to these owls. While little data has been collected on the overall effect great horned owls have on Cooper's hawk populations, it is known that for the larger, more formidable goshawk that as many as 40% of radiotagged juveniles within a study appeared to meet their demise via horned owls.Ward, J. M., & Kennedy, P. L. (1996). Effects of supplemental food on size and survival of juvenile Northern Goshawks. The Auk, 200–208. Due to their threat level, the calls of great horned owls provoke a strong response from Cooper's hawks and banders and researchers usually use stimuli of great horned owls to attract a mobbing Cooper's hawks.Bloom, Peter, Henckel, J., Henckel, E., Schmutz, J., Woodbridge, B., Bryan, J., Anderson, R. & Detrich, P. (1992). The dho-gaza with great horned owl lure: an analysis of its effectiveness in capturing raptors. Journal of Raptor Research. 26: 167–178. Reportedly, Cooper's hawks will temporarily tolerate and possibly even cooperate with crows when one or the other spots a great horned owl in the daytime, both species appearing to join forces to mob the threatening owl out of the vicinity. In one case, after a great horned owl pair failed to successfully breed in a nest built by other Cooper's hawks, a pair of Cooper's who tried to nest was supplanted by horned owls, possibly of the same pair who had previously failed.

Other natural predators of Cooper's hawks that are known are mainly larger diurnal birds of prey. In some cases, their larger cousins, northern goshawks, will prey on Cooper's hawks. Widely but somewhat scarcely, red-tailed hawks have been known to prey on Cooper's hawk, while a single instance is known of a Cooper's falling prey to a golden eagle (Aquila chrysaetos).Peyton, S. B. (1945). Western Red-tailed Hawk catches Cooper's Hawk. Condor, 47: 167.), Less is known about the range of nest predators. Among all known predators, only the raccoon (Procyon lotor) can be considered to rival the great horned owl as the most severe threat to nesting attempts, probably consuming mostly nestlings and eggs but also perhaps some older hawks.Stout, W. E., Rosenfield, R. N., Holton, W. G., & Bielefeldt, J. (2007). Nesting biology of urban Cooper's Hawks in Milwaukee, Wisconsin. The Journal of Wildlife Management, 71(2), 366–375. American crows are known to rob nests of Cooper's hawks as well, especially when the parents have been displaced by the crow's severe mobbing. Smaller diurnal birds of prey are, in turn, threatened by Cooper's hawks. This is especially the case with the American kestrel. After some regional declines, a radiotagging study in Pennsylvania found that of 19 kestrels, 26% were killed by avian predators, with the suspected culprit in a majority of the cases being the Cooper's hawks.C. Michael Hogan, ed. 2010. American Kestrel. Encyclopedia of Earth, U.S. National Council for Science and the Environment, Ed-in-chief C. Cleveland Some resources have gone as far as to blame the kestrels decline directly on Cooper's hawk predation but subsequent data from the U.S. Breeding Bird Survey and the National Audubon Society Christmas Bird Count appear to discount this theory, instead linking the overall declines to inadvertent human causes.Lesko, M. J., & Smallwood, J. A. (2012). Ectoparasites of American Kestrels in northwestern New Jersey and their relationship to nestling growth and survival. Journal of Raptor Research, 46(3), 304–313. Cooper's hawk are also counted as a predator of merlins (Falco columbarius). The only confirmed accipitrid that Cooper's hawk have been known to prey upon is their smaller cousins, the sharp-shinned hawks. However, in the southeast, the Cooper's hawks was counted among the potential, but not yet confirmed, predators of swallow-tailed kites (Elanoides forficatus) and nesting kites appear to engage in anti-predator behavior towards Cooper's hawks. Furthermore, Cooper's hawks that came into the vicinity were considered potential predators and mobbed as such by nesting gray hawks.

Even more so than diurnal raptors, a wide diversity of owls are known to fall prey to Cooper's hawks. Despite the temporal differences of their activity, the intensive hunting methods of Cooper's hawks may allow them to access roosting owls more readily than other types of hawks. Small owls that the Cooper's hawk have been known to prey upon have included flammulated owls (Psiloscops flammeolus),Borell, A. E. (1937). Cooper's hawk eats a flammulated screech owl. Condor, 39, 44. eastern screech-owls (Megascops asio), western screech-owls (Megascops kennicottii), whiskered screech-owl (Megascops trichopsis), elf owl (Micrathene whitneyi), northern pygmy owl (Glaucidium gnoma), ferruginous pygmy owl (Glaucidium brasilianum), burrowing owl (Athene cunicularia), boreal owl (Aegolius funereus) and northern saw-whet owl (Aegolius acadicus). Medium to large-sized owls are sometimes also prey for Cooper's hawks have been known to include long-eared owl (Asio otus) and perhaps the rather large spotted owl (Strix occidentalis).Bull, E. L., Wright, A. L., & Henjum, M. G. (1989). Nesting and diet of Long-eared Owls in conifer forests, Oregon. The Condor, 91(4), 908–912. Most impressively, an instance was observed where a Cooper's hawk appeared to have preyed upon an adult of the rather larger (averaging about ) barred owl (Strix varia). There is also a record of a barred owl preying on a Cooper's hawk as well.

Breeding
Breeding territory and prelaying behavior

The Cooper's hawk is a solitary bird apart from breeding and rare aggregations during migration. This species usually is considered monogamous. However, pairings of two males (1 young, 1 adult) with a single female have been recorded at least three times.Deal, E., Bettesworth, J., & Muller, M. (2017). Two records of female Cooper's Hawks courting two different males in neighboring urban territories. Journal of Raptor Research, 51(1), 83–84. In Grand Forks, North Dakota, a single male has been recorded to successfully mate with two nearby females, with similar records from New Mexico. However, the breeding efforts in Grand Forks were found to be disproportionately producing males, seven to one. A Wisconsin study determined 19.3% of nestlings in a Milwaukee study area were from extra-pair couplings and that 34% of all broods included at least 1 extra-pair young. Despite their generally monogamous breeding system, Cooper's hawks are often rather inconsistent regarding breeding for life (as many other birds of prey do). Lifetime nesting area fidelity in male Cooper's Hawks in Wisconsin. The Condor, 98(1), 165–167. Meanwhile, in Arizona, 3% of males and 10% of females displayed yearly breeding dispersal. However, in the urbanized areas of Tucson, evidence indicates that mate fidelity is higher than elsewhere. In Tucson, it was found that the mean distance of the mated pairs was only  during the non-breeding season and 36 interactions were recorded almost all in the core range, indicating an unusually close perennial typical pair bond here. The rate of dispersal to a different breeding ground was a much higher at 68% in north Florida.

Data in Wisconsin shows that pairs line up in correspondence with their size, i.e. larger female Cooper's hawks mate with large males and smaller females with smaller males. The data indicated that larger pairs tend to have earlier laying dates, larger broods and more recruits than smaller ones. Relatively large body mass may be a heritable trait. However, no correlation was found between the age of the pair and apparent breeding site quality and time of breeding or annual productivity (though older females may lay slightly earlier than yearlings in most cases).Rosenfield, R. N., & Bielefeldt, J. (1999). Mass, reproductive biology, and nonrandom pairing in Cooper’s Hawks. Auk, 116: 830–835. In Arizona, birds of each sex were found to usually pair with like-age individuals. Pairs frequently high circle together. Either sex or the pair together perform in courtship, sometimes over an open field. Courting usually occurs on bright, sunny days, in midmorning. During sky-dances by males, the wings are raised high over back in a wide arch with slow, rhythmic flapping, similar to the flight of a nighthawk, with exaggerated down strokes. Often, much like the northern goshawk, the displaying male flares his undertail coverts.Mockford, E. L. (1951). Courtship performance of male Cooper's Hawk, Accipiter cooperii. Indiana Aud. Quart. 29: 58–59. Sometimes frequently for a month or so, the pair will perform as such. The bowing display reported in Wisconsin, usually (but not always) done by the male, may be a sign to the other mate of their readiness to nest build. Breeding may begin as early as February in the southern part of range, but, for the most part, the breeding season is from April to July. Both members of pair arrive by early March in Wisconsin and, in both Pennsylvania and Wisconsin, nest building and copulation is often complete within the month of March. Generally both members of a pair remain on the breeding ground vicinity year-around in Arizona, New Mexico and even in British Columbia.

In Michigan, the density average was 1 pair per . Distribution, density, and productivity of accipiter hawks breeding in Oregon. The Wilson Bulletin, 182–196. Rather small areas may be defended where hunting occurs near the nest. Typical home range sizes for Cooper's hawks are between .Reynolds, R. T. (1989). Status reports: Accipiters. Paper read at Proc. western raptor management symposium and workshop, at Washington, D.C. Home range for a Wisconsin male hawk is around  during breeding and about  during non-breeding. Male home ranges in Tucson (sample size 9) averaged , being smaller than in Wisconsin due to better prey concentrations (doves), however juvenile males in rural Tucson areas covered a home range of .Mannan, R. W., Estes, W. A., & Matter, W. J. (2004). Movements and survival of fledgling Cooper's Hawks in an urban environment. Journal of Raptor Research, 38(1), 26–34. The nesting ecology of Cooper's Hawks and Northern Goshawks in the Jemez Mountains, NM: a summary of results, 1984–1988 (Final Report). Santa Fe National Forest, U.S.D.A. Forest Service. Home ranges of females tend to constrict with age. In central New York, the nest sites of various other woodland birds were surprisingly close to those of Cooper's hawks, though some of the nest were occupied by other birds of prey that are not regularly threatened by these hawks (though flickers, one of the birds most at threat by the hawks, were fairly dispersed away from the hawk's nests). As in most accipitrids, copulation is brief (averaging about 4.5 seconds) and frequent (at around 0.9 per hour), with total copulations averaging per season about 372.

Nest

Often the nest is shallower in conifers (i.e.  deep in New York) and deeper in broad-leafed trees (averaging  in New York). Nests average larger in the eastern part of the range than in the west, perhaps in keeping with the eastern hawks’ larger average body sizes. While sticks are almost always used, one unusual Florida nest was observed to be made largely of Spanish moss (Tillandsia usneoides).Grimes, S. A. (1944). Birds of Duval County (continuing). Florida Nat, 17, 21–31. Often nests are lined by the Cooper's pair with bark or odd bits of greenery. The male grabs at bark like prey, while the female, if participating, may tear off bark with her bill; the piles of bark may be up to 3 inches deep by the time eggs are laid, though green spray is added considerably less often than other species of hawks such as Buteo. One male, unusually, was seen to be engaging in nest building while helping parent an active brood in mid-summer. Habitat characteristics of Cooper's Hawks and Northern Goshawks nesting in New Mexico. In Proceedings of the Southwestern Raptor Management Symposium and Workshop (R. Glinski, B. G. Pendleton, M. B. Moss, B. A. Millsap, and S. W. Hoffman, Editors). National Wildlife Federation, Washington, DC, USA. pp. 218–227. Usually nest sites are within plots of woodland of at least  in size, with a canopy coverage usually over 64%, but can be much smaller in some urban vicinities.Call, M. (1978). Nesting habitats and surveying techniques for common western raptors. U.S. Bureau of Land Management, Denver, CO, USA. One unusual nest in North Dakota was in dense shrub rather than a tree and it even successfully produced fledglings. Another unconventional nesting area in North Dakota in the Little Missouri National Grassland and was recorded to have unusually open canopy, at a mean of 55%, and to be in a rather steep sloped area. An unusual nest site in Wisconsin was on a grapevine. Water access is of secondary import. Pine plantations are popular nesting sites across several parts of the range. In Tucson, 70.8% of 48 nests were found to be non-native Eucalyptus trees. Native white pine (Pinus strobus) was preferred in Massachusetts, at 58% of 48 nests, and in Pennsylvania, at 78% of 18 studied nests, and the most used tree in a study from Wisconsin as well, at 35% of 82 nests. Shortleaf pine (Pinus echinata), another native was preferred in Missouri (at 51% of 43 nests) and in Illinois (at 81% of 16 nests).Ehrlich, R. M. & Drickamer, L.C. (1993). Habitats used for nesting by Cooper's Hawks (Accipiter cooperii) in southern Illinois. Transactions of the Illinois State Academy of Science, 86: 51–62. Deciduous trees may be preferred elsewhere in the east, such as American beech (Fagus grandifolia) in New York (39% of 36 nests), oaks in Maryland (66%) and laurel oak (Quercus laurifolia) in north Florida (81% of 77 nests). Douglas firs (Pseudotsuga menziesii) were preferred in northwest Oregon (94% of 18 nests) and also in northeast Oregon as well as in British Columbia (34% of 64 nests), often where mistletoe parasitizes the tree (64% of 31 in the overall state of Oregon were on mistletoe).Campbell, R. W., Dawe, N.K. McTaggart-Cowan, I., Cooper, J.M. Kaiser, G.W. & McNall, M.C.E. (1990). The Birds of British Columbia, Volume 2. Diurnal Birds of Prey Through Woodpeckers. Royal British Columbia Museum, Victoria, BC, Canada. Ponderosa pine (Pinus ponderosa) were preferred in eastern Oregon (53% of 15 nests) as well as in New Mexico. In the enormous redwood forests of California, all Cooper's hawk nests were in more modestly sized native tan-oaks (Notholithocarpus densiflorus).

It has historically taken to almost be a rule that Cooper's hawk uses a new nest site each year. Exceptionally, though, pairs have used the same nests for up to 4 years, though mostly records show up to 2 to 3 years of use when a nest is reused. As much as 59% of 17 nests (New Mexico) or 66.7% of 12 nests (southern Illinois) may be reused in the following year but this is not usual. In north Florida, 21% of nests were reused in a subsequent year, while in New York, it was around 10%. In Alberta, a female was reported to use a grove of trees over two consecutive years as a nest site, be absent for one year and then returned to nest in the same grove the subsequent year. Nest building usually takes about two weeks. However, if a clutch is lost, a pair may repair and use another nest within four days. A majority of 385 nests (40–60% annually) in Wisconsin built on pre-existing structures. At times, the material is put on the residue of a crow's nest, squirrel's drey or even a woodrat tree nest. In Tucson, nest building was recorded during winter, exceptionally. When grass is found to be incorporated in nest structure, it is an indication that the Cooper's is using a nest built by crows as they have never themselves been known to use grass. Oregon nests frequently incorporate mistletoe into the nest, more so those built by pairs with mature females rather than juvenile females. Their nest structure requires about 4.8 support branches. Data is conflicting on whether it is the male or the female who selects the nest site. Males were found to do 70% of the nest building in Wisconsin but the female does not consistently take a secondary role. Mostly, the male gathers nesting materials within  of the nest. The male snaps off twigs with his feet to build with, though smaller twigs may be carried in the bill. After an early duet, at as early as 5:30, the male may start nest building at around 6:30. Later in the day, he will hunt, though females also hunt at this stage, much of her food is brought by him. South-facing nests are thought to be avoided, possibly due to solar irradiance reducing soil moisture, tree density and shading or possibly due to the more deciduous local nature of north-facing nest sites. When using a prior years nest, the female reportedly selects and repairs it.

Eggs 

Egg laying in New York is between after April 24 to June 26 (about 50% from May 10 to 20) with similar dates in New England and also from Ohio to Minnesota. Similar laying dates were also found for Ontario as well as in British Columbia, but more laying date variation was found for the latter province.Peck, G.K., & James, R.D. (1983). Breeding Birds of Ontario: Nidiology and Distribution Volume 1: Nonpasserines. Royal Ontario Museum, Toronto, Ontario, Canada. Data shows that mean egg laying times in Wisconsin may be shifting earlier by up to 4–5 days in different years, but the current mean is 1.3 days.Rosenfield, R. N., Hardin, M. G., Bielefeldt, J., & Keyel, E. R. (2017). Are life history events of a northern breeding population of Cooper's Hawks influenced by changing climate? Ecology and evolution, 7(1), 399–408. Similar shifts may be occurring in New York state as well.McGowan, K. J., & Corwin, K. (2008). The Second Atlas of Breeding Birds in New York State. Cornell University Press, Ithaca, NY, USA. From New Jersey to Virginia, egg laying may be from April 7 to May 23 (about 52% from April 29 to May 11), with similar dates on the opposite coast, from Washington state to California. From Florida to Baja California, egg-laying can began as early February, but, despite the lower latitude, known records show most are between mid-April and early May and can even run into June. Similar egg-laying dates, peaking around late April, are known in Arizona. The mean clutch initiation, in 57 clutches from North Dakota was mid-May and, though pairs arrive more than a month before that, the mean dates are consistently 2–3 weeks later in nests at other similar latitude in British Columbia and Wisconsin. It was determined in Maryland that egg-laying and other mean dates rival or are even later than the longer distance migrating broad-winged hawk, and are much later in general than other Buteo hawks here. Dates of egg laying and other behaviors were also found to average slightly later than the even further migrating Buteo, the Swainson's hawk (Buteo swainsonii). The clutch size averages anywhere from about three to five. Female egg laying is individually consistent from year-to-year, with a variance of a day or two. Often about 3–5 eggs are laid every other day, though can be up to 2 days between the 4th and 5th eggs.

Clutch sizes fell historically from a mean of 3.5 (1929–1945) to 3.1 (1946–1948) and 2.7 (1949–1967) during the use of DDT then back up to 3.3 in 1967–1976 after DDT was banned.Braun, C. E., Enderson, J. H., Henny, C. J., Meng, H., & Nye Jr, A. G. (1977). Conservation committee report. Falconry: Effects on raptor populations and management in North America. The Wilson Bulletin, 89(2), 360–369. 7 of 266 clutches in early museum records were 6 egg clutches while one 7 egg clutch was recorded in Arizona.Ellis, D. H., & Depner, G. (1979). A Seven-Egg Clutch for the Cooper's Hawk. The Condor, 81(2), 219–220. Records of 2 egg clutches may usually be laid by yearling females. The mean clutch size in 72 clutches was 3.5 and 3.33 in 46 clutches in central Arizona.Apfelbaum, S. I., & Seelbach, P. (1983). Nest tree, habitat selection and productivity in seven North American raptors. J. Raptor Res, 17, 99–104. Clutch sizes were similar in Ontario, at around a mean of 3.4, and in North Dakota, at 3.5.Rosenfield, R. N., Bielefeldt, J., Rosenfield, L. J., Stewart, A. C., Nenneman, M. P., Murphy, R. K., & Bozek, M. A. (2007). Variation in reproductive indices in three populations of Cooper's Hawks. The Wilson Journal of Ornithology, 119(2), 181–188. In southern Illinois, the mean clutch size is 4.1. The average clutch size in Wisconsin Cooper's hawks was 4.3, with a little varying range of 3.9 to 4.8 over 6 years. The clutch size in Wisconsin is on average 1–3 eggs smaller in immature females. There was no strong differences in Wisconsin in clutch sizes between urban and rural locations.Rosenfield, R. N. (1996). Urban nesting biology of Cooper's Hawks in Wisconsin. Raptors in human landscape, 41–44. In British Columbia, the mean clutch size was a particularly high 4.43. A clutch of 5 may be laid in 10 days and hatch in a span of about 3 days. Some authors suspect that clutch size is functionally reliant on habitat quality. The eggs are pale sky blue, fading to dirty white, with a smooth texture. However, an occasional set is reported as lightly spotted. It is reported by some authorities that the spotted eggs are laid by a female that does so each year, however others opine that these are misidentified eggs that were laid by broad-winged hawks. California eggs averaged  in a count of 82.

Parental behavior
Incubation starts with the laying of the third egg. Evidence shows that pairs may be able to successfully delay breeding somewhat if it is unusually harsh and snowy early spring. The female mainly incubates (including throughout nighttime) though the male may substitute for 10–30 minutes after he brings his mate food, often doing so for about 2 to 3 times a day. The male usually roosts nearby during incubation, when he begins calling, she may join for 5–10 minutes before quickly flying back. By the third week, she may leave the nest only to take food or to defecate. Incubation lasts for 34–36 days, but sometimes may be down to 30 days. Eggs may be discarded by the mother after hatching but those that never hatch are left in place. The female sleeps on the nest until the young are 2 weeks old. The young were photographed to sleep at night directly under her body until there is not enough room to do so. The male is rarely present at nest longer than 3–4 seconds after hatching but at least once was recorded staying for 3 minutes when coming with prey after the female stops heavily brooding. Most prey deliveries are intercepted by the female slightly away from the nest. The nest may be crowded while the nestlings grow, and the female may expand platform with additional sticks. Usually the male Cooper's hawk removes the head and viscera of prey before bringing it, then taking it to plucking stumps, although often the plucking is done right where prey is killed. Rate of feeding depends on brood size but is dictated in part by the availability and size of prey.Snyder, N. F., & Snyder, H. A. (1973). Experimental study of feeding rates of nesting Cooper's Hawks. Condor, 461–463. Only 2 to 3 food deliveries daily are usually necessary during incubation but the male has to hunt constantly once the young are large, rarely plucking and no longer decapitating prey. Peak deliveries are typically needed in about the 4th week. 6–9 deliveries a day are usually necessary for broods of 3 to 5. New Mexican nests with adult females had 95 prey deliveries in 120 hours of observations, whereas nest with younger females (i.e. second years), there were 65 prey deliveries were observed in 120 hours, or 694 fewer prey individuals per square kilometer than nests on territories of adult females. The parents are non-aggressive usually when the nest area is breached but the female may dive and call if a person climbs directly to their nest, sometimes also the male, often doing so silently. The reaction to human intrusion varies among individuals and probably with stage of nesting, hatch date, and probably prior experience. Generally, individuals rarely strike humans.Rosenfield, R.N. & Bielefeldt, J. (1991). Reproductive investment and anti-predator behavior in Cooper's Hawks during the pre-laying period. J. Raptor Res, 25(4), 113–115. Prolonged visits to the nest by humans, i.e. more than 30 minutes or around an hour, can cause temporary nest abandonment, and can be the cause of up to 1.2% of nest failures. During early incubation, the female often quietly flushes if a person comes up to nest tree or knocks on it but will sometimes call if someone climbs to the nest. After 2 weeks, she may begin to make "half-hearted" dives at the climber. After 3 or 4 weeks, some females still quietly flush but others grow increasingly aggressive with much variance in temperament. The aggressiveness increases around hatching, decreases for the first couple weeks after hatching, then quickly increases after 3 weeks. All dives at climbers are mock ones to early on but after the young are about 3 weeks old, either one of the pair may actually hit and draw blood from the climbers. Despite a reputation as a "somewhat aggressive" or even as being a hawk with a "very aggressive defense" towards humans in nest defense, the actual rate of attacks even at peak times seems to be very low and the reputation is thought to be fairly unearned.Morrison, J. L., Terry, M., & Kennedy, P. L. (2006). Potential factors influencing nest defense in diurnal North American raptors. Journal of Raptor Research, 40(2), 98–110. Various researchers consider this species less aggressive to intruders than either of the other North American Accipiter, and some even less so than red-shouldered hawks as well. Anti-predator behavior by parent Cooper's hawks against crows, red-tailed hawks and eastern gray squirrels were observed in Wisconsin to be surprisingly six times more often carried out by the male rather than the female. Female defensive attacks are sufficiently forceful enough to drive away more formidable predators such as bobcats (Lynx rufus) from the nest area. When large quadrupeds walk under the nest, the female may utter a semi-alarm call but does not leave the nest.

Development of young

Sex ratio can skew towards male in eggs, nestlings and fledglings in about 54–60% in nests of Cooper's hawks in the region of Milwaukee. However the sex ratio corrected over time in the urban area to an even amount, though it is still skewed outside the city (skewed broods towards males occur in cases where the females may become too costly to bring up, needing longer development stages and more foods).Rosenfield, R. N., Bielefeldt, J., & Vos, S. M. (1996). Skewed sex ratios in Cooper's Hawk offspring. The Auk, 957–960. There are similar cases of male skewed ratios recorded now in southwestern cities (i.e. Tucson and Albuquerque).Mannan, R. W., Steidl, R. J., & Boal, C. W. (2008). Identifying habitat sinks: a case study of Cooper’s hawks in an urban environment. Urban Ecosystems, 11(2), 141–148. Due to the female usually only beginning incubation with the third egg, the first three eggs often hatch on the same day, while the fourth and fifth eggs often hatch one (rarely up to three) day later. Hatchlings are covered in white natal down with blue-gray eyes and are tan to pink on many of the bareparts. While growth is slow for about three days, sexual dimorphism by size may begin by to be measurable by about seven days of age. At about 10 days, the nestlings begin to engage in rather feeble standing and wing flapping. The bill (at around 11 days) grows about twice as fast as the tarsus (at around 22 days). At 13 days, the nestlings stretch their legs and often yawn, and at 16 days can be aggressive if the nest is breached by people. Down first becomes deep and fluffy around two weeks, the following week first feathers among dense down, feather production accelerates but growth slows in the fourth week after which both increase for the fifth week. By 16–18 days, the nestlings preen well, starts to rip at prey and flap well. Within first two weeks, the young Cooper's hawks begin to defecate over nest edge but often soil the edge of nest. At three weeks often begin to stand up and feed by themselves and often begin to mantle prey away from each other. The young grow is rapid for the period when they are 17 days old to about 23 days, growth then slows down abruptly before they nearly pause growth to feather out and then thereafter become fully grown. At the age of three weeks a female nestling may stand and be able to fully feed herself. Sometimes smaller, more agile male nest mates may snatch several bits of meat from their larger sister as if taking food from the mother. Siblicide rarely has been proven for this species, and may occur "accidentally" at times. Sometimes a younger sibling that has died from other means may be eaten by the siblings or by the parents. In one case, an entire brood of 4 nestlings from 2.5 to 3.5 weeks old were found dead in the nest, apparently having died due to exposure after consistent heavy rains. Normal departure from nest is 30 days (up to 27 days) for males and 34 days for females, but averaged sooner in Oregon, at 27–30 days. Response to the parents after the young Cooper's becoming branchers depends on their hunger levels. Snyder and Wiley recorded feeding rates of 0.267 per hour for a brood of 2 and 0.564 per hour for a brood of 4. In New York and Wisconsin, the sex ratio of broods roughly even, but slightly male biased in Wisconsin (53.5% or 137 against 119). Food may be brought to the nest for the first ten days after the young leave it, as the young often return to rest on it or even to sun from it. Largely, the young are quiet until they leave the nest when they begin their loud, persistent hunger calls. Around this stage, the young hawks will frequently engage in play with sticks and pinecones. After they are about eight weeks old, they may start to hunt for themselves, but are usually still reliant on parents for food. The young Cooper's hawks are frequently loud, voracious and aggressive in procuring food from the parents. The parents soon seem to lose interest in feeding the young. Fledgling occurs at 27–34 days (males averaging earlier), but the young may often returns to nest and are not fully feathered until about 50–54 days. The siblings often stay within  of each other even after leaving their parents range. Siblings before long-distance dispersal may hunt together, although may too steal prey from one another.

Juveniles Cooper's hawks in mostly urban areas of Arizona wandered somewhat randomly it seems until they were about 2.5–3 months old, when they settled on a wintering ground, averaging  for females and averaging  in males away from their respective natal sites. Attempts to average mean dispersal distances within another study found farther than expected dispersal distances for Cooper's hawks from across the range. Greater dispersal distances by female juveniles are probably meant to limit the likelihood of inbreeding. In one instance, a grandson Cooper's mated with his grandmother over 3 years while there were two instances known of full siblings mating in Victoria, British Columbia.Stewart, A. C., Rosenfield, R.N. & Nyhof, M.A. (2007). Close inbreeding and related observations in Cooper's Hawks. Journal of Raptor Research, 41: 227–230. Cooper's hawks usually first breed at 2 years old but yearlings can often be reported to average at 6 to 22% of the breeding populations in short 3–6-year studies. Longer-term studies of 16–25 years of large urban populations within Milwaukee, Wisconsin, Tucson, Arizona and Victoria, British Columbia, show yearling females average 16–25% of the breeding population but that breeding by yearling male was uncommon to non-existent. Similarly, 79% more females bred in their first year in study in New Mexico than did males. Despite the considerable number of breeding young females, in Oregon, they averaged about 1 egg smaller and nearly a fledgling smaller than their older female counterparts; while results in Albuquerque were even more skewed towards breeding success for older females. Many studies found no yearling males to be breeding with various populations but 7% of 184 males in Tucson were yearlings over several years of study (78% of which were paired with immature females). Only one breeding male in both Victoria, British Columbia (579 sample size) and in Albuquerque (sample size 305) were yearling while 4.8% of 123 in Milwaukee were yearlings (92% of which were paired with an adult female). In New Mexico, males sometimes bred in their first year where there were rich prey concentrations, but had 37% higher mean annual mortality than those who did not breed until mature plumaged. New Mexican data showed that 14% of 20 males bred in their first year and 71% in their second year while 93% of the local female bred in their first year. In addition to Tucson, other cases of successful breeding by pairs of immatures reported in varied areas such as Indiana and New York.Rothstein, P. (1993). Cooper's Hawk nesting in a suburban garden. Kingbird 43:278–292. Considerable numbers of juvenile Cooper's hawks breeding may be historically associated with high turnover within populations. Evidence from the Milwaukee area shows a significant reduction in more recent decades of two-year old or younger breeding hawks, which was indicative of a recovering population.

Breeding success
The average of 117 successful laid clutches was 4.18 eggs laid, 3.53 nestlings in successfully hatched clutches and 3.08 young in 26 successfully fledged broods in the Northeastern United States and southeastern Canada. Nesting success in western Pennsylvania in 32 successful nests was 3.2 fledglings; in 6 nests within Michigan, a mean of 3 in all nests got to fledge (4.3 eggs, 3 hatchlings on average); in Wisconsin, 3.5 fledglings were produced from successful nests (68.6% of 83 nests produced at least 1 fledgling); a mean of 2 fledged from 11 nests in Maryland and 2.23 fledglings per 41 successful nests in Arizona. In Illinois, in all breeding attempts (not just successful ones), the mean number of fledglings was 2.8. 81% of New York nests produced fledged young and 75% did so in Pennsylvania. Nesting success rates in western wildland areas may be lower such as in Utah, where 53.5% of nests fledged young, with many of the failures attributable to owl predation. Data from Oregon showed that 74% hatched and 61.4–69% successfully fledged, a much lower rate of nest success than goshawks, at 90.4%, and, surprisingly, than sharp-shinned hawks, at 91.7%. However, in the Oregon data, the number of eggs hatched was higher in Cooper's at 74% than in sharp-shinned hawks, at 69.4% (but not than the goshawk's).Reynolds, R. T. (1974). Distribution, density, and productivity of three species of accipiter hawks in Oregon. In Wisconsin in 2019, all of the eggs in a clutch of seven hatched and all of the young fledged. In North Dakota, better habitat such as upland forest showed much higher breeding success levels (at least 1 fledgling in 86% of 26 nests) than in poorer habitats such as narrow riparian strips, in which 1 fledgling was produced in 57% of 44 nests. Younger forest in North Dakota was surprisingly preferred, with the average estimated age of trees used by Cooper's at 59.9 against a random tree age in the area of 74.6. It was found that adult female who mated with males who provisioned food at a higher rate produced 1.6 more fledglings on average. Yearling females in northeastern Oregon tended to use younger successional stands than older females and tended to have lower productivity in clutch size and brood counts. Among 70 studied male hawks in Wisconsin, the number of fledged young produced in their lifetime was similar in males who didn't breed until they were two years old (mean of 8.8 fledglings) compared to those who started breeding as yearlings (mean of 8.7 fledglings), with the most successful studied male having started breeding in his second year and had produced 32 fledglings by the time he was nine years of age. In Arizona and New Mexico, 23% of nests failed altogether and 56.5% of 23 nests in Wisconsin failed during incubation. A high genetic diversity, or allele level, was found in the nestlings of the urbanized population of Tucson, ensuring a hardy local population despite historic concerns about the parasite levels of nestlings in these populations.Bielefeldt, J., & Rosenfield, R. N. (2000). Comment: comparative breeding ecology of Cooper's hawks in urban vs. exurban areas of southeastern Arizona. Journal of Wildlife Management, 64(2), 599–600.

Longevity and parasitism
The Cooper's hawks can be a long-living bird. Some authors credit lifespans of up to 8 years of age in the wild.Kennard, J. H. (1975). Longevity records of North American birds. Bird-banding, 55–73. The oldest recorded bird recorded among migrants that bred in Oregon was 10 years and 5 months old. The oldest recorded breeding bird was a 12-year-old female in British Columbia while the oldest recorded wild bird was 20 years, 5 months old, banded in migration.Lutmerding, J. A., & Love, A. S. (2016). Longevity Records of North American Birds. Version 2016.1. Laurel, MD: Patuxent Wildlife Research Center. Bird Banding Laboratory. However, the mean age at death recorded in 136 banded Cooper's hawks was 16.3 months. It was estimated for the species that the mortality rate in the first year of life for these hawk is 71–78% while it about 34–37% in the subsequent years. An annual survival rate of 75% was recorded for juvenile males in Tucson while the survival rate for juvenile female here was 64%. The survival rate for Tucson adults was between 69 and 88%. 75% was considered the survival rate of wintering Cooper's hawks in Indiana and southern Illinois but mean mortality between adults and juveniles was estimated to possibly average up to 46.4%.Roth, T. C., Lima, S. L., & Vetter, W. E. (2005). Survival and causes of mortality in wintering Sharp-shinned Hawks and Cooper's Hawks. The Wilson Journal of Ornithology, 117(3), 237–244. The annual survival rate in Albuquerque was 27–38% for female immatures. No correlation was found to body size or habitat in female survivorship but those in Wisconsin who changed nest sites annually may have had slightly higher survival rates than those who reused a same nest site. The opposite trend was reported for north Florida, wherein females who reused a nest site seemed to have higher survival rates. Historic survival rates (1925–1940) as reported were much lower, with extensive persecution causing an annual mortality that was estimated at about 44%. Regular natural causes of mortality in Cooper's hawk, mainly of their young, include hypothermia, windstorms and tree collapses. Clashes between members of the same sex can be lethal, especially those between two males. Although Cooper's hawks are not known to prey on venomous snakes, one was found dead from envenomation next to a burrow holding both a copperhead (Agkistrodon contortrix) and an eastern diamondback rattlesnake (Crotalus adamanteus). Hunting accidents can frequently cause injury, especially in the form of potentially hobbling bone fractures, or sometimes can kill Cooper's hawks, especially those living in urban areas.Bedrosian, B. E., & Pierre, A. M. S. (2007). Frequency of injuries in three raptor species wintering in northeastern Arkansas. The Wilson Journal of Ornithology, 119(2), 296–298.Morishita, T. Y., Fullerton, A. T., Lowenstine, L. J., Gardner, I. A., & Brooks, D. L. (1998). Morbidity and mortality in free-living raptorial birds of northern California: a retrospective study, 1983–1994. Journal of Avian Medicine and Surgery, 78–81. In Indiana and Illinois, mortality from collisions were somewhat more prevalent in Cooper's hawks than in sharp-shinned hawks but instances of predation on immature sharp-shins were three times more prevalent than predations on immature Cooper's. Despite the risks of urban living, evidence indicates that urban Cooper's seem to be relatively successful, have moderate to low annual survival and reproduce prolifically. Cooper's hawks are known to be vulnerable to West Nile virus with some regularity but sometimes are able to survive despite the viral antibodies being found.Stout, W. E., Cassini, A. G., Meece, J. K., Papp, J. M., Rosenfield, R. N., & Reed, K. D. (2005). Serologic evidence of West Nile virus infection in three wild raptor populations. Avian Diseases, 49(3), 371–375.Hull, J., Ernest, H., Hull, J., Hull, A., Reisen, W., Fang, Y., & Ernest, H. (2006). Variation of West Nile virus antibody prevalence in migrating and wintering hawks in central California. The Condor, 108(2), 435–439. Some mortality from West Nile has been reported, unsurprisingly. Fatal infections of the herpes virus have been recorded at least twice in Cooper's hawks. Cooper's hawks, along with great horned owls, had the greatest seroprevalence of Avipoxvirus among several raptorial birds in Illinois.

An extremely high amount of Trichomoniasis was found in nestlings in southeast Arizona. The bacteria was recorded in 95% of urban Cooper's hawk nestlings (though only 8% of non-urban ones) and caused about 50% of recorded nestling deaths, probably roughly doubling the nestling mortality rate compared to the non-urban areas.Bradley, C. A., Gibbs, S. E., & Altizer, S. (2008). Urban land use predicts West Nile virus exposure in songbirds. Ecological Applications, 18(5), 1083–1092. Adults are less vulnerable to Trichomoniasis infections but there was no variability to be found by sex, time of year or by location.Gerhold, R. W., Yabsley, M. J., Smith, A. J., Ostergaard, E., Mannan, W., Cann, J. D., & Fischer, J. R. (2008). Molecular characterization of the Trichomonas gallinae morphologic complex in the United States. Journal of Parasitology, 94(6), 1335–1341. In Wisconsin and British Columbia only 2.7% of 145 studied nestlings had Trichomoniasis.Rosenfield, R. N., Taft, S. J., Stout, W. E., Driscoll, T. G., Evans, D. L., & Bozek, M. A. (2009). Low prevalence of Trichomonas gallinae in urban and migratory Cooper's Hawks in northcentral North America. The Wilson Journal of Ornithology, 121(3), 641–644. A high balance of the bacterial disease Mycoplasma gallisepticum, common to birds who frequent bird feeders, was found in Cooper's hawks (transmitted from their prey) studied in Illinois (the highest of any six raptor species studied) however effective antibodies were found and no external infection was noted. A high balance of bacterial flora were found the airways of 10 Cooper's hawks, including many with Salmonella (rarely fatal in hawks but can compromise their condition). 91% of 47 tested adults in Wisconsin had Leucocytozoon toddi and 62% had Haemoproteus but only 12% of 33 nestlings there had parasites.Sehgal, R. N., Hull, A. C., Anderson, N. L., Valkiūnas, G., Markovets, M. J., Kawamura, S., & Tell, L. A. (2006). Evidence for cryptic speciation of Leucocytozoon spp.(Haemosporida, Leucocytozoidae) in diurnal raptors. Journal of Parasitology, 92(2), 375–379. A similar blood parasite infection rate was found in northern New York (and California) as well. Compared to sharp-shinned hawks, while migrating off Lake Ontario, Cooper's hawks were found to have higher white blood cell counts (heterophiles, monocytes, and eosinophils) that may have made them more vulnerable to blood parasitism.Valkiūnas, G., Sehgal, R. N., Iezhova, T. A., & Hull, A. C. (2010). Identification of Leucocytozoon toddi group (Haemosporida: Leucocytozoidae), with remarks on the species taxonomy of leucocytozoids. Journal of Parasitology, 96(1), 170–177. Haematozoa infection rates were also higher in adults than they were in nestlings in Arizona.Boughton, D. C., Boughton, R. B., & Volk, J. (1938). Avian hosts of the genus Isospora (Coccidiida). Blood parasites were recorded to be higher for later migrating Cooper's hawks in northern New York but were, on the contrary, higher in earlier migrating hawks in Marin County, California.Ishak, H. D., Loiseau, C., Hull, A. C., & Sehgal, R. N. (2010). Prevalence of blood parasites in migrating and wintering California hawks. Journal of Raptor Research, 44(3), 215–223. Even rare parasites such as Sarcocystis may be found in wild Cooper's hawks, being apparently more prevalent in juvenile hawks and slightly more often afflicting females rather than males.von Dohlen, A. R., Scott, D., Dubey, J. P., & Lindsay, D. S. (2019). Prevalence of Sarcocysts in the Muscles of Raptors from a Rehabilitation Center in North Carolina. Journal of Parasitology, 105(1), 11–16. Helminths were quite diverse in Cooper's hawks from Florida. In Minnesota and Wisconsin, several helminths were recorded and there was one instance of a tissue reaction from Serratospiculum as well as a case was reported of related Serratospiculoides in an injured Cooper's hawk in Yellowstone National Park.Taft, S. J., Suchow, K., & Van Horn, M. (1993). Helminths from some Minnesota and Wisconsin raptors. Journal of the Helminthological Society of Washington, 60(2), 260–263.
 

Status and conservation
Historic status
Cooper's hawks have had an erratic status throughout the 20th into the 21st centuries. Historic data shows a threefold increase, roughly, around 1920. However, mortality rates shot up soon after as some authors consider the annual rate of mortality due largely to legalized direct persecution (poisoning, "pole trapping" and, especially, shooting) between 1925 and 1957 could range up to 60.5–77.6% in the most severe years. The amount of hawks shot down within different populations was estimated at 12 to 40%. Migration counts during the 1930s showed a strong downward trend, and an even worse decline for Cooper's hawk was observed during the late 1950s.Nagy, A. C. (1977). Population trend indices based on 40 years of autumn counts at Hawk Mountain Sanctuary in northeastern Pennsylvania. In Proceedings of the World Conference on Birds of Prey (R. D. Chancellor, Editor), Vienna, Austria. International Council Bird Preservation, Hampshire, United Kingdom. pp. 243–253. Most Cooper's hawks reacted to heavy persecution by behaving with more shyness and elusiveness. Much of the human animosity towards Cooper's hawks was due to their hunting of gamebirds such as quail which human hunters themselves coveted. Furthermore, even ornithological writings from these times reveal a strong bias against the hawks for their hunting of admired small birds. However, several studies have determined that Cooper's hawk predation is not detrimental to healthy gamebird population, and that most of the blame must fall directly on overexploitation and habitat destruction of humans themselves, with a more recently quantified causal of changing climate further exacerbating the gamebirds’ declines.Moss, R., Storch, I., & Müller, M. (2010). Trends in grouse research. Wildlife Biology, 16(1), 1–11. Human hunting of Cooper's hawk declined when governmental protection of the species was instituted in the late 1960s (nearly two decades after some less controversial birds of prey species were protected in America).

However, instead of the expected gradual recovery, in the 1960s to 1970s, the breeding success rate dropped, in almost certain correlation with man's use of chemical biocides, mostly DDT. Raptorial birds which predominantly prey on either birds or fish were severely affected by the DDT biocide. The concentrations of organochlorines like DDT were high in all American Accipiters, averaging at intermediate levels in the Cooper's (0.11 mg/kg) but could include the highest known in the Accipiters at up to 1.5 mg/kg. A considerable average reduction in eggshell thickness was measured to average at around 7%. A particularly severe reduction in eggshell thickness was recorded in New York state, at an average of 19.02%.Pattee, O. H., Fuller, M. R., & Kaiser, T. E. (1985). Environmental contaminants in eastern Cooper's hawk eggs. The Journal of wildlife management, 49(4), 1040–1044. The survival of the species, especially in the eastern part of the continent, was seriously questioned in the 1960s and 1970s. Fewer dramatic ebbs were detected during the height of DDT use in the western part of North America overall, perhaps because of less overall reliance on bird prey.Jones, S. (1979). The accipiters-Goshawk, Cooper's Hawk, Sharp-shinned Hawk. U.S. Bureau of Land Management. Nonetheless, 11 of 16 eggs in Arizona and New Mexico broke due to this cause. Subsequent to the prohibition of DDT use in North America, the population increased exponentially in the 1980s and 1990s and ultimately was thought to stabilize. Data from Hawk Mountain Sanctuary shows that the Cooper's hawk has recovered from DDT more gradually than the sharp-shinned hawk here.

Current status
In the 1990s, it was estimated that the Cooper's hawks may number "well into six figures" due to their regular distribution over 8 million square kilometers. Today, the Cooper's hawk is thought to number around 800,000 in the United States and Canada. Evidence from long-time migration counts at Bake Oven Knob show slight peaks at intervals of 3 to 4 years, however no dramatic declines have been detected since the 1980s.Heintzelman, D. S. (1986). The migrations of hawks. Indiana University Press. Following their historic decline, Breeding Bird Surveys have tracked strong increases of the breeding population (upward trends from 1.2% in California to 4.4% in Pennsylvania) in six states, with a 2.2% increase overall, and similar trends in multiple other states. In many states (Arizona, California, Florida, Missouri, New Mexico and North Dakota) the numbers are probably similar or greater to those prior to 1945.Murphy, R. K. (1993). History, nesting biology, and predation ecology of raptors in the Missouri Coteau of northwestern North Dakota. PhD dissertation, Montana State University, Bozeman, MT, USA. It is thought that the population of Cooper's hawks in Wisconsin is nearly saturated relative to the landmass of the state, after a rough 25-fold increase since the late 1970s. Based largely on data from well-known populations such as Tucson and Milwaukee, some authors opine that the Cooper's hawk may be the most common raptor in American urban areas today, although surely other common raptorial birds such as red-tailed hawks, American kestrels and turkey vultures (Cathartes aura) may easily rival them in this regard. 

Potential threats
Shooting is now a generally insignificant cause of mortality though is still sometimes reported.Evans, D. L. (1982). Status reports on twelve raptors. U.S. Fish and Wildlife Service Special Scientific Report no. 238, Washington, DC, USA. Despite the declining effect of pesticides on the Cooper's hawk's overall population, lingering harmful effect from dieldrin has been indicated in some hawks in British Columbia and recently some hawks have been killed by the pesticide warfarin.Deem, S. L., Terrell, S. P., & Forrester, D. J. (1998). A retrospective study of morbidity and mortality of raptors in Florida: 1988–1994. Journal of Zoo and Wildlife Medicine, 160–164. Bioaccumulation of pollutants may still have considerable effect on this species. Declines due to pollutants are seemingly occurring for Cooper's hawks living in Vancouver. Recent cases of cyanide poisoning of Cooper's hawks have been reported. Lead poisoning can sometimes threaten Cooper's hawks, through lead bullets left in dead or injured game. Most urban-related mortality for Cooper's hawks is likely to be collisions with manmade objects. These are mostly wire strikes (with or without resulting electrocution), automobile collisions and window strikes or with other parts of manmade structure while distractingly hunting. 70.8% of diagnosed mortality for Cooper's hawks of yearling age or older in Tucson was from such collisions. In less developed regions, such as much of Montana, the rate of wire collisions and electrocutions was considerably lower for Cooper's hawks than for various other birds of prey who are either larger-bodied and/or use less forested areas.Harness, R. (1996). Raptor Electrocutions on Electric Utility Distribution Overhead Structures. In Proceedings of Rural Electric Power Conference (p. B4). IEEE. Cooper's hawks found in the vicinity of airports are at risk of bird strike with aircraft, therefore 185 Cooper's were translocated away from these areas (the 5th most frequently translocated raptor species). A similar translocation effort away from the Los Angeles basin around the Los Angeles International Airport translocated 349 Cooper's hawks (about a fifth of all translocated raptors), apparently successfully. Cooper's hawks are sometimes displaced by the placement of wind farms, with studies indicating that the Cooper's need about seven years to locally recover from such displacement. Synurbization has been detected in Cooper's hawks as, despite the dangers of various kinds of collisions, it has been found that in favorable urban areas, hawks of the species can seem to breed more closer to one another, gather more food and produce more young on average than those outside such areas.Neese, M. R., Seitz, J., Nuzzo, J., & Horn, D. J. (2008). Population trends of raptors admitted to the Illinois Raptor Center, 1995–2005. Transactions of the Illinois State Academy of Science, 101(3–4), 217–224. Even New York City has seen (if erratically present) since the late 1990s, a return of nesting Cooper's hawks.

Logging may decrease some populations but the overall effect it has on Cooper's hawks is generally considered unknown. As with all Accipiters, Cooper's hawks can presumably only withstand a certain level of loss of habitat before an area becomes essentially unlivable. Studies in Arizona determined that heavily grazed agricultural areas were favored over lightly grazed ones due to greater prey concentrations in the latter habitats. On the contrary, in the early 1990s (while the species was generally recovering), the species was considered to be "state-endangered" in New Jersey, with ongoing harmful effects found for poorly-regulated (or entirely unregulated) logging and land development within  of active nests. In the Black Hills, harvesting of ponderosa pines appears to be causing the Cooper's and both other species of Accipiter to vacate large parts of the forest. Studies in New Mexico showed that these hawks are reliant on the conservation of riparian woodlands in much of the southern part of the state. Despite the large, productive and genetically diverse population of Cooper's hawks in Tucson, several authors have hypothesized, controversially, that the city is an ecological trap, due to the unsustainably high turnover for nestlings via Trichomoniasis-related mortality and for adults via frequent lethal collisions. Other studies support that the number of fatal window and wire collisions of urban-living Cooper's hawks is "excessively high". Quite few Cooper's hawks have ever been gathered for use in falconry. This hawk is fairly unpopular in falconry practices due to its high-strung personality and is additionally considered in such captive conditions as given towards "tyrannical", "hysterical" and "demanding" behaviors, even compared to its similarly disposed larger cousin, the northern goshawk, which is fairly popular in falconry.Bodio, S. (1984). A Rage for Falcons. Nick Lyons Books, New York, NY, USA.McLeran, V. (2000). The Cooper's Hawk: a cross timbers chronical. XLibris, Philadelphia, PA, USA.

Threat to conservation dependent species
Generally, Cooper's hawks hunt the locally common birds that are available and probably control some birds (such as the more numerous icterids and corvids) that may without the influence of natural predation risk overpopulation and potential harm to ecosystems. However, as an opportunistic natural predator of almost any North American bird smaller than itself, the Cooper's hawk may inadvertently deplete populations of rarer, conservation-dependent species. The American kestrel, whose populations have experienced considerable decrease, may be one species which has suffered from the extensive predation of the recovered Cooper's hawk population. However, there is no evidence that Cooper's hawk predation is one of the leading causes of kestrel declines and data seems to indicate it is, at most, a localized threat.Sullivan, B. L., & Wood, C. L. (2005). The changing seasons – a plea for the common birds. North American Birds, 59:20–30. Similarly, the Cooper's hawks occasionally prey upon other threatened bird species, and, although said predation is not a primary cause of concern, may exacerbate the already worrying condition of many declining North American birds. Some threatened species known to be thusly hunted by these hawks are greater prairie chicken (Tympanuchus cupido), lesser prairie chickens (Tympanuchus pallidicinctus), red-headed woodpeckers, Bell's vireo (Vireo bellii), Florida scrub jay (Aphelocoma coerulescens), wood thrush (Hylocichla mustelina) (the Cooper's being identified as one three major nest predators along with blue jays and raccoons), golden-winged warbler (Vermivora chrysoptera), cerulean warbler (Setophaga cerulea) and golden-cheeked warbler (Setophaga chrysoparia'').

Images

References

Further reading
 
 
Schmitt, N. John., Clark, William S.., Kiff, Lloyd. Raptors of Mexico and Central America. United States: Princeton University Press, 2017. ISBN 9781400885077
Wheeler, Brian K.., Clark, William S.. A Field Guide to Hawks of North America. United Kingdom: Houghton Mifflin, 2001. ISBN 9780395670675
Threatened and Endangered Plants and Animals in New Hampshire's Forested Habitats: A Guide for Foresters and Other Land Managers. United States: University of New Hampshire Cooperative Extension, 2005.
Edwards, Ernest Preston., Butler, Edward Murrell. A Field Guide to the Birds of Mexico and Adjacent Areas: Belize, Guatemala, and El Salvador, Third Edition. United States: University of Texas Press, 1998. ISBN 9780292720916

External links

Cooper's hawk Species Account – Cornell Lab of Ornithology
Cooper's hawk – Accipiter cooperii – USGS Patuxent Bird Identification InfoCenter
 
 
 

Cooper's hawk
Birds of North America
Birds of the United States
Cooper's hawk
Cooper's hawk
Articles containing video clips
Fauna of California